= Negative evidence in language acquisition =

Evidence about what is ungrammatical in a language

In language acquisition, negative evidence is information concerning what is not possible in a language. Importantly, negative evidence does not show what is grammatical; that is positive evidence. In theory, negative evidence would help eliminate ungrammatical constructions by revealing what is not grammatical.

Direct negative evidence refers to comments made by an adult language-user in response to a learner's ungrammatical utterance. Indirect negative evidence refers to the absence of ungrammatical sentences in the language that the child is exposed to.

There is debate among linguists and psychologists about whether negative evidence can help children determine the grammar of their language. Negative evidence, if it is used, could help children rule out ungrammatical constructions in their language.

== Direct negative evidence ==
Direct negative evidence in language acquisition consists of utterances that indicate whether a construction in a language is ungrammatical. Direct negative evidence differs from indirect negative evidence because it is explicitly presented to a language learner (e.g. a child might be corrected by a parent). Direct negative evidence can be further divided into explicit and implicit forms.

On the other hand, indirect negative evidence is used to determine ungrammatical constructions in a language by noticing the absence of such constructions.

== Explicit direct negative evidence ==
A corpus study found that explicit negative evidence was "very rare", and concluded that because parents do not reliably correct their children's grammatical errors, explicit negative evidence does not facilitate language learning. Psychologist David McNeill argues that when parents correct children explicitly, the correction is unlikely to be helpful in learning grammar because it is a single correction that will most likely not be repeated, and therefore a child might not remember or even notice the correction. This is demonstrated in the following exchange between a parent and child, which McNeill recorded:

Child: Nobody don't like me.
Mother: No, say, "nobody likes me."
Child: Nobody don't like me.
[This exchange is repeated several times]
Mother: No, now listen carefully. Say, "Nobody likes me."
Child: Oh! Nobody don't likes me.

As this conversation reveals, children are seemingly unable to detect differences between their ungrammatical sentences and the grammatical sentences that their parents produce. Therefore, children typically cannot use explicit negative evidence to learn that an aspect of grammar, such as using double negatives in English, is ungrammatical. This example also shows that children can make incorrect generalizations about which grammatical principle a parent corrects, suggesting that there must be something other than explicit feedback which drives children to arrive at a correct grammar.

== Implicit direct negative evidence ==
=== In the input ===
Implicit direct negative evidence occurs when a parent responds to a child's ungrammatical utterance in a way that indicates that the utterance was not grammatical. This differs from explicit direct negative evidence because the parent merely implies that the child's utterance is ungrammatical, while explicit direct negative evidence involves a parent unambiguously telling a child that a sentence they produced is ungrammatical. There are several types of implicit direct negative evidence which parents utilize in responses to children's ungrammatical utterances. These forms include: repetitions, recasts, expansions, and requests for clarification. Repetitions occur when a parent repeats a child's utterance word for word, whereas recasts occur when a parent repeats a child's utterance while correcting the ungrammatical part of the sentence. Expansions are similar to recasts because they are potentially corrective utterances, but in expansions a parent also will lengthen the child's original utterance. Requests for clarification occur when a parent asks a question that can prompt a child to fix an ungrammatical sentence they previously said. Generally speaking, there is consensus that implicit direct negative evidence exists in the input, though there is debate about whether children can use implicit direct negative evidence to learn the grammar of their language. It is argued that parents frequently reformulate children's ungrammatical utterances.

=== Utility ===
Some types of implicit direct negative evidence, such as reformulations, occur regularly in the input, thus making them potentially usable forms of evidence for language acquisition. Some studies have demonstrated that parents respond differently when children utter grammatical or ungrammatical utterances, which suggests that children can use this parental feedback to learn grammar. Some evidence also supports the hypothesis that children actually use implicit direct negative evidence in practice (see section below).

Though there have been a number of studies that support the hypothesis that children can use implicit direct negative evidence that exists in the input, there have also been studies which stand in stark contrast to this hypothesis. Linguists who do not believe that implicit direct negative evidence is helpful for a language learner argue that studies supporting the utility of implicit direct negative evidence do not properly specify which types of utterances qualify as recasts. They criticize the fact that some types of implicit direct negative evidence are not necessarily corrective (i.e. parental responses that may qualify as implicit direct negative evidence can occur after either grammatical or ungrammatical utterances). Additionally, some of these linguists question how children would know to only pay attention to certain kinds of recasts and not others.

Furthermore, Gary Marcus argues that implicit direct negative evidence in the input is insufficient for children to learn the correct grammar of their language. He asserts that negative evidence does not explain why sentences are ungrammatical, thus making it difficult for children to learn why these sentences should be excluded from their grammar. He also argues that for children to be able to even use implicit direct negative evidence, they would need to receive negative feedback on a sentence 85 times in order to eliminate it from their vocabulary, but children do not repeat ungrammatical sentences nearly that often. Marcus also purports that implicit evidence is largely unavailable because the feedback differs from parent to parent, and is inconsistent in both the frequency with which it is offered and the kinds of errors it corrects. Other studies demonstrate that implicit negative evidence decreases over time, so that as children get older there is less feedback, making it less available and, consequentially, less likely to account for children's unlearning of grammatical errors.

=== Usage ===
Assuming that implicit direct negative evidence is usable, there are some studies which demonstrate that children do use implicit direct negative evidence to correct their grammatical mistakes. For example, experiments show that children produce a greater number of grammatical sentences when parents provide them with any type of immediate implicit direct negative evidence, including recasts. This evidence supports claims that direct negative evidence assists a child in their language learning. Chouinard also found that children are highly attentive to parental responses and that children respond to implicit correction in predictable ways. Children tend to directly respond to these reformulations by either affirming the reformulation or disagreeing with their parent if the parent misunderstood the child's intended meaning, revealing that children can discern when parental feedback is meant to correct their grammatical errors. Additionally, children have been shown to correct their initial errors when a parent recasts the child's morphological error.

However, other researchers have conducted studies that demonstrate that children do not need negative feedback in order to learn language. This is evidenced in a case study in which a mute child was tested to see whether he could comprehend a grammar even though he had received no corrective feedback (since corrective feedback occurs as a response to ungrammatical sentences that children produce). Though the child did not produce any speech and therefore did not receive any negative feedback, researchers found that he was able to learn grammatical rules. Although this study does not answer whether negative evidence can be helpful for learning language, it does suggest that direct negative evidence is not needed to learn grammar. Another study also demonstrates that implicit negative evidence is a negative predictor of the rate at which children eliminated ungrammatical utterances from their speech.

== Direct negative evidence in language learning ==
Though there is no consensus regarding whether there is sufficient and usable implicit negative evidence in the input, if children are exposed to direct negative evidence, then they could use that evidence to validate hypotheses they have made about their grammar. On the other hand, if there is not sufficient usable negative evidence in the input, then there is a "no negative evidence" problem, which questions of how a language learner can learn language without negative evidence. This is a problem because if a child only hears grammatical sentences which are consistent with multiple grammars, then it would be impossible to determine which grammar is correct unless there was some other factor influencing what grammar a child ultimately hypothesizes to be correct.

Proponents of linguistic nativism suggest that the answer to the "no negative evidence" problem is that language knowledge that cannot be learned is innate. They argue that the language input is not rich enough for children to develop a fully developed grammar from the input alone. This view is referred to as the poverty of the stimulus argument. The central idea of the poverty of the stimulus argument is that children could have multiple hypotheses about aspects of their grammar which are distinguishable only by negative evidence (or by hearing ungrammatical sentences and recognizing those sentences as ungrammatical). Supporters of the poverty of the stimulus argument assert that because the negative evidence that is needed to learn language by the input alone does not exist, children cannot learn certain aspects of grammar from the input alone, and therefore there must be some aspects of grammar which involve innate mechanisms.

== Indirect negative evidence in language acquisition ==
Indirect negative evidence refers to using what's not in the input to make an inference about what's not possible. For example, when we see a dog bark, we are likely to think that dogs bark, not that every kind of animal barks. This is because we have never seen horses or fish or any other animal bark, so our hypothesis becomes that only dogs bark. We use this same inference to assume that the sun will rise tomorrow, having seen it rise every other day so far. No evidence received indicates that the sun may not rise once every two thousand years, or only rises on years that are not 2086, but since all evidence seen so far is consistent with the universal generalization, we infer that the sun does indeed rise every day. In language acquisition, indirect negative evidence may be used to constrain a child's grammar; if a child never hears a certain construction, the child concludes that it is ungrammatical.

== Utility of indirect negative evidence ==
=== Indirect negative evidence and word learning ===
Child and adult speakers rely on 'suspicious coincidences' when learning a new word meaning. When learning a new word meaning, children and adults use only the first few instances of hearing that word in order to decide what it means, rapidly constricting their hypothesis if only used in a narrow context. In an experiment conducted by Fei Xu and Joshua Tenenbaum, 4-year-old participants learning a novel word 'fep' readily decided that it referred only to Dalmatians if only hearing it while shown pictures of Dalmatians; although they received no information that 'fep' was unable to refer to other kinds of dogs, the suspicious coincidence that they had never heard it in other contexts caused them to restrict their meaning to just one breed.

=== Indirect negative evidence and syntax ===
Child language learners can use this same type of probabilistic inference to decide when and how verbs can be used. A word children hear often, like 'disappear', is more likely to be used than a less common word with a similar meaning, 'vanish'. Children studied said that the ungrammatical sentence "*We want to disappear our heads" was ungrammatical, but when given the same sentence with vanish, they were less sure of the grammaticality. Given the frequency of 'disappear' in intransitive clauses, learners could infer that if it were possible in transitive clauses, they would have heard it in those contexts. Thus, the high frequency of the intransitive verb use leads to the inference that the transitive verb use is impossible. This inference is less reliable with a less frequent verb like "vanish" because children have not heard enough instantiations of the verb to infer that it is never transitive.

It has been argued that children use indirect negative evidence to make probabilistic inferences about the syntax of the language they are acquiring. A 2004 study by Regier & Gahl produced a computational model which provides support for this argument. They assert that children can use the absence of particular patterns in the input in order to conclude that such patterns are illicit. According to Regier and Gahl, young language learners form hypotheses about what is and isn't correct based on probabilistic inferences. As children are exposed to more and more examples of a certain phenomenon, their hypothesis space narrows. Notably, Regier and Gahl assert that this ability for probabilistic inference can be used in all sorts of general learning tasks, and not just linguistic ones. Regier and Gahl also present their model as evidence against an argument from the poverty of the stimulus, because their model illustrates that syntactic learning is possible from using the input alone, and does not necessarily require some innate linguistic knowledge of syntax.

However, probabilistic inferences based on indirect negative evidence can lead children to make an incorrect hypothesis about their language, which leads to errors in early language production. In his variational model, Charles Yang notes that based on indirect negative evidence, English-acquiring children could conclude that English is a topic-drop language, such as Chinese. A topic-drop language allows the subject and object to be dropped in a sentence as long as they are in topic. English does not allow topic-drop, as evidenced by the insertion of expletive subjects in sentences such as There is rain. Yang notes that in English child-directed speech, children very rarely hear expletive subjects. Yang asserts that this leads English-acquiring children to momentarily conclude that English is a topic-drop language. His assertion is supported by the parallels between the topic-drop errors made by English-acquiring children and the licit topic-drop sentences produced by Chinese-speaking adults.

Some researchers argue that indirect negative evidence is unnecessary for language acquisition. For example, Abend et al. built a Bayesian inference model that mimics a child's acquisition of English, using only data from a single child in the CHILDES corpus. They found that the model successfully learned English word order, mappings between word labels and semantic meanings of words (i.e. word learning), and used surrounding syntax to infer the meaning of novel words. They conclude that the success of this model shows that it is possible for children to acquire language on positive evidence alone, as the model did not make use of what was not in the input.

== See also ==
- Language acquisition
- Linguistics
- Universal grammar
