= Innate language =

The concept of an innate language is referenced in various fields within philosophy, philosophy of language, linguistics, philosophy of mind, psycholinguistics, and other cognitive sciences.

- In philosophy, "innate language" may refer to:
  - Being - as a system of sensual and holistic "language" within the mind
  - Innatism - the idea that the mind is born with knowledge (of being) and is not a "blank slate"
- In linguistics, "innate language" may refer to:
  - Universal grammar - investigation into linguistic commonalities
  - I-language and comprehension (linguistics)
  - Language acquisition device (i.e. "brain")
  - Innateness hypothesis - in language acquisition
  - Language bioprogram theory
- In the cognitive sciences,
  - Language module
  - Psycholinguistics
  - Cognition, thought (as constituted by an "innate language")

== Other ==
- The Language Instinct, and Words and Rules - books by Steven Pinker
- Special:Search/Innate language - search Wikipedia for "innate language"
