= Domain-specific learning =

Neurological theory

Domain-specific learning theories of development hold that we have many independent, specialised knowledge structures (domains), rather than one cohesive knowledge structure. Thus, training in one domain may not impact another independent domain. Domain-general views instead suggest that children possess a "general developmental function" where skills are interrelated through a single cognitive system. Therefore, whereas domain-general theories would propose that acquisition of language and mathematical skill are developed by the same broad set of cognitive skills, domain-specific theories would propose that they are genetically, neurologically and computationally independent.

Domain specificity has been supported by a variety of theorists. An early supporter was Jerry Fodor, who argued that the mind functions partly, by innate, domain-specific mental modules. In Modularity of Mind, Fodor proposed the Hypothesis of Modest Modularity, stating that input systems such as perception and language are modular, whereas central systems such as belief fixation and practical reasoning are not. By contrast, evolutionary psychologists have supported the Massive Modularity Hypothesis, arguing that the mind is not just partially, but completely modular, composed of domain-specific modules genetically shaped by selection pressures to carry out innate and complex functions. Core knowledge theorists such as Elizabeth Spelke hold that knowledge can be separated into a few, highly specialised, domain-specific bodies.

== Domain-specific learning mechanisms ==
Domain-specific learning mechanisms are cognitive systems specialized for acquiring particular kinds of knowledge or competence through experience. Sperber proposes that many innate cognitive modules are learning mechanisms of this kind, which generate acquired modules whose stored information (and, in some cases, processing procedures) are shaped by experience.

=== Language ===
The Poverty of the Stimulus (PoS) argument proposed by Noam Chomsky takes a nativist view towards language acquisition suggesting that innate, domain-specific knowledge structures help us to navigate tough linguistic environments. This flows contrary to empiricist views that learning and knowledge derive from our sensory experiences. The PoS argument maintains that there is a mismatch between the linguistic knowledge that we acquire, and how much information is available to us in the environment.

Chomsky believed that children cannot be empiricist learners of language, because many linguistic principles are neither simple nor natural to acquire. Therefore, a sufficient linguistic environment would be required to facilitate a full understanding of language. However, the data needed to grasp these linguistic principles is not always available due to different environmental conditions. Despite this, all normal children are still able to formulate an accurate representation of grammar which led Chomsky to theorise that children must have an innate, domain-specific capacity for language.

==== Further support for nativism ====
1. Biological time-clock

Evidence shows that children go through similar stages of language development at similar times, leading to many linguists advocating for an innate and pre-determined linguistic schedule.

Table 1 - The rough milestones of language development
Language stage	Beginning age
Crying	Birth
Cooing	6 weeks
Babbling	6 months
Intonation patterns	8 months
1-word utterances	1 year
2-word utterances	18 months
Word inflections	2 years
Questions, negatives	2 1/4 years
Rare or complex constructions	5 years
Mature speech	10 years

2. Predictability of error

Children explore a diverse range of grammars in their environment as they develop. Under empiric learning, this would likely cause them to make all kinds of unpredictable linguistic errors. However, children make errors that exhibit regularity. When expressing verbs in past tense form, they often overgeneralise irregular forms such as came and saw into comed and seed to match "regular" forms such as loved and worked. The way children deal with environmental irregularity has therefore led to the proposition of a domain-specific language hypothesis space.

3. Specific Language Impairment (SLI)

A dissociation between intelligence and linguistic functioning has been shown in people with SLI. Evidence has also indicated that people with Grammatical-SLI experience grammar-only deficits. The case of SLI may therefore indicate an independent linguistic system.

==== Criticisms ====
Many critics have argued against the convincingness of the PoS argument, stating that Chomsky's theory is vague, incoherent and untestable. Therefore, debate still remains about the extent to which language learning is an innate, domain-specific process.

=== Socialisation ===
Socialisation is integral to a child's ability to acquire the necessary skills to function in a social environment. It has commonly been viewed as a product of domain-general learning, with the same organisational principles applying to child development, regardless of setting, task or developmental stage. Objections have therefore been raised on its unitary approach and lack of consideration for variation across contexts.

Instead, researchers have proposed a socialisation process involving five domains, stating that different parent-child relationships serve different functions, rely on different ways to bring about behavioural change, and have different outcomes.

1. Protection

Primarily responsible for giving the child a sense of security through adopting a comforting parenting style. This results in children being able to better manage stress knowing that support will be available to them.

2. Reciprocity

Mutual compliance forms this relationship where parent and child fulfil each other's desires and treat each other as equals. The reciprocity domain nurtures a child's tendency to reciprocate, which can predict pro-social behaviour.

3. Control

The control domain involves parents who modify their child's behaviour through exerting the necessary amount of authority to achieve the socialisation agent's goals. Consequently, outcomes involving a child's ability to suppress conflicting desires to make the correct moral and principled judgements are typical.

4. Guided learning

Aims to effectively guide children's learning through strategies and feedback to help acquire the target knowledge and skills.

5. Group participation

Parents attempt to encourage shared identity for the child through promoting routines and rituals that reflect group norms. Successful outcomes involve children conforming to and adopting group values that build on their notions of social identity.

==== Further research ====
Although these five domains have demonstrated initial evidence for input and output differences in socialisation, additional research is required as the taxonomy of domains remains disputed.

== Opposition to domain-specific learning ==
Although some arguments have supported domain-specific learning, there still remains debate about how we truly learn and develop.

Support for domain-general learning include theories from Jean Piaget and Charles Spearman. Piaget argued that developments in domain-general cognitive architecture drives learning and conceptual change in his theory of cognitive development. Similarly, Spearman proposed an underlying, domain-general g-factor (general intelligence) to explain one's performance on all types of mental tests.

However, research has also introduced the possibility of a combination of domain-specific and domain-general learning mechanisms. In the mathematical field, it has been hypothesised that both mechanisms are at work and target arithmetic skills differently. It has further been suggested that the magnitude of each mechanism in determining mathematical achievement varies across grades. Therefore, research is needed to better understand our learning across a wide range of fields.

== See also ==
- Conditioned taste aversion
- Developmental psychology
- Domain-general learning
- Learning
- Wason selection task
