= Neuroconstructivism =

Theory about how the brain sculpts itself and becomes specialized over time

Neuroconstructivism is a theory that states that phylogenetic developmental processes such as gene–gene interaction, gene–environment interaction and, crucially, ontogeny all play a vital role in how the brain progressively sculpts itself and how it gradually becomes specialized over developmental time.

Supporters of neuroconstructivism, such as Annette Karmiloff-Smith, argue against innate modularity of mind, the notion that a brain is composed of innate neural structures or modules which have distinct evolutionarily established functions. Instead, emphasis is put on innate domain relevant biases. These biases are understood as aiding learning and directing attention. Module-like structures are therefore the product of both experience and these innate biases. Neuroconstructivism can therefore be seen as a bridge between Jerry Fodor's psychological nativism and Jean Piaget's theory of cognitive development.

== Development vs. innate modularity ==
Neuroconstructivism has arisen as a direct rebuttal against psychologists who argue for an innate modularity of the brain. Modularity of the brain would require a pre-specified pattern of synaptic connectivity within the cortical microcircuitry of a specific neural system. Instead, Annette Karmiloff-Smith has suggested that the microconnectivity of the brain emerges from the gradual process of ontogenetic development. Proponents of the modular theory might have been misled by the seemingly normal performances of individuals who exhibit a learning disability on tests. While it may appear that cognitive functioning may be impaired in only specified areas, this may be a functional flaw in the test. Many standardized tasks used to assess the extent of damage within the brain do not measure underlying causes, instead only showing the static end-state of complex processes. An alternative explanation to account for these normal test scores would be the ability of the individual to compensate using other brain regions that are not normally used for such a task. Such compensation could only have resulted from developmental neuroplasticity and the interaction between environment and brain functioning.

Different functions within the brain arise through development. Instead of having prespecified patterns of connectivity, neuroconstructivism suggests that there are "tiny regional differences in type, density, and orientation of neurons, in neurotransmitters, in firing thresholds, in rate of myelination, lamination, ratio of gray matter to white matter," etc. that led to differing capabilities of neurons or brain regions to handle specific functions. For example, the ventral and dorsal streams only arise because of innate differences in processing speed of neurons, not an innate selection to be either ventral or dorsal by the respective neurons. Such a differentiation has been entitled a domain-relevant approach to development.

This contrasts the previous domain-general and domain-specific approaches. In the domain-general framework, differences in cognitive functioning are attributed to overarching differences in the neurons across the entire brain. The domain-specific approach in contrast argues for inherent, specific differences within the genes which directly control a person's development. While it cannot rule out domain-specificity, neuroconstructivism instead offers a developmental approach that focuses on change and emergent outcomes. Such change leads to domain-specificity in adult brains, but neuroconstructivism argues that the key component of the specificity occurred from the domain-general start state.

Every aspect of development is dynamic and interactive. Human intelligence may be more accurately defined by focusing on the plasticity of the brain and its interactions with the environment rather than inherent differences within the DNA structure. Dissociations seen in Williams syndrome or autism provide neuroscientists with a means of exploring different developmental trajectories.

== Context dependence ==
Neuroconstructivism uses context to demonstrate the possible changes to the brain's neural connections. Starting with genes and incorporating progressively more context indicates some of the constraints involved in development. Instead of viewing the brain as independent of its current or previous environment, neuroconstructivism shows how context interacts with the brain to gradually form the specialized adult brain. In fact, by being built on preexisting representations, representations become increasingly context bound (rather than context free). This leads to "restrictions of fate" in which later learning is more restricted than earlier learning. Neuroconstructivism refers to how we construct our conceptual frameworks throughout our lives. It appeals to early childhood development, culture, and education.

=== Genes ===
Previous theories have supposed that genes are static unchanging code for specific developmental outcomes. However, new research suggests that genes may be triggered by both environmental and behavioral influences. This probabilistic epigenesis view of development suggests that instead of following a predetermined path to expression, genes are modified by the behavior and environment of an organism. Furthermore, these modifications can then act on the environment, creating a causal circle in which genes influencing the environment are re-influenced by these changes in the environment.

=== Encellment ===
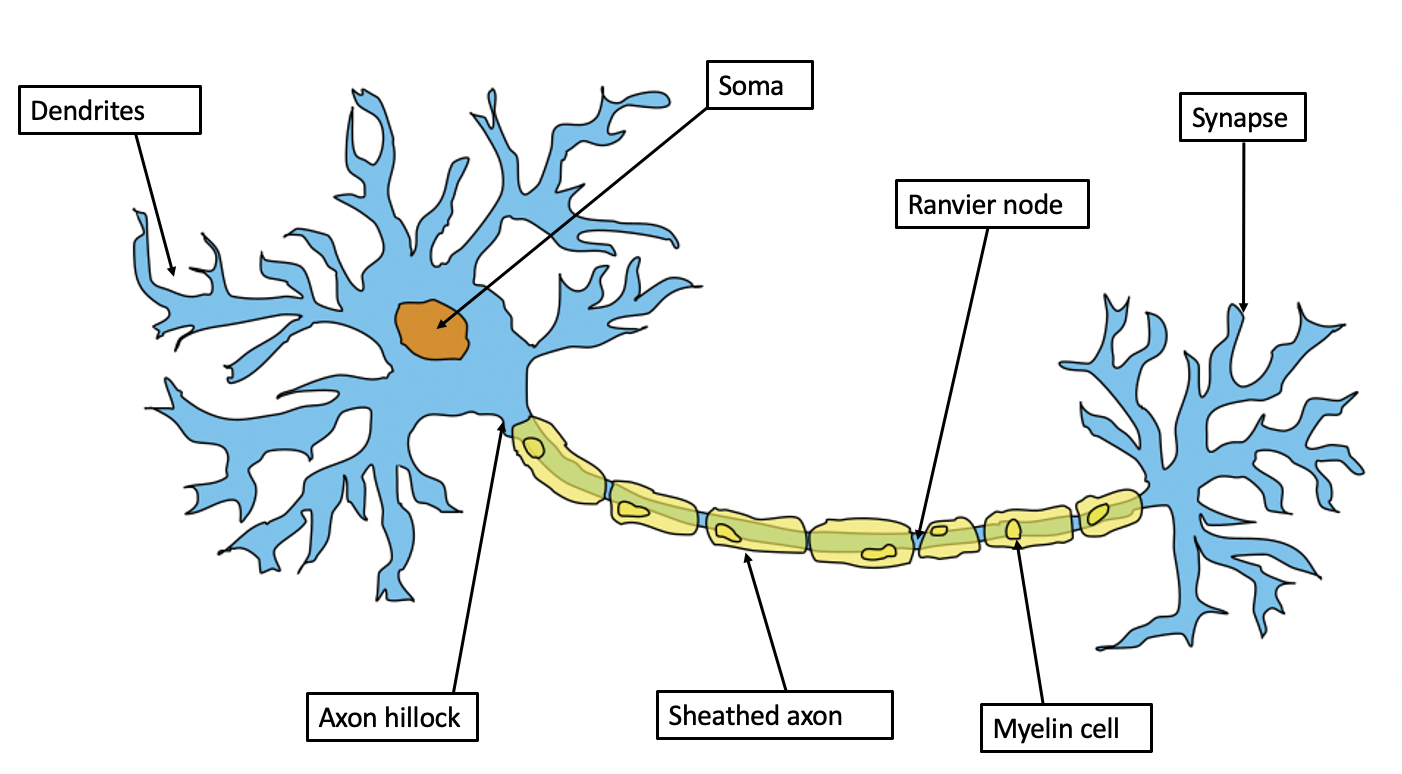
Diagram of a neuron. Note the dendrites and synapse of the neuron. It's these two ends of the neuron that make neuron to neuron interactions possible.

Cells do not develop in isolation. Even from a young age, neurons are influenced by the surrounding environment (e.g. other neurons). Over time, neurons interact either spontaneously or in response to some sensory stimulation to form neural networks. Although the exact number of neurons in the brain is an unknown, there are estimations ranging from 100 billion to an approximate 128 billion. This allows a vast neural network to be formed, and consequently a "storage capacity of the human brain." Competition between neurons plays a key role in establishing the exact pattern of connections. Through neuron-neuron communication made possible by the neuron's synapses, axon, and dendrites, different neurons can influence each other and lead to changes in the neural network. This is important for processing information and learning new material. This is possible because of neuron interactions that occur between neurons. As a result, specific neural activation patterns may arise due to the underlying morphology and connection patterns within the specified neural structures. These may subsequently be modified by morphological change imposed by the current representations. Progressively more complex patterns may arise through the manipulation of current neuronal structures by an organism's experience.

=== Enbrainment ===
While neurons are embedded within networks, these networks are further embedded within the brain as a whole. Neural networks do not work in isolation, such as in the modularity of mind perspective. Instead, different regions interact through feedback processes and top-down interactions, constraining and specifying the development of each region. For example, the primary visual cortex in blind individuals has been shown to process tactile information. The function of cortical areas emerges as a result of this sensory input and competition for cortical space. "This interactive specialization view implies that cortical regions might initially be non-specific in their responses but gradually narrow their responses as their functional specialization restricts them to a narrower set of circumstances." Circumstances within a person's life can result in head trauma. Instances such as concussions from sports and high-impact accidents can result in the brain colliding into the skull. This causes neurons to be damaged and the brain to be bruised. During this time, brain function is temporarily lost since the neurons are being damaged. Repeated instances of head trauma can lead to the development of lasting brain damage.

Chronic stress causes long-term changes in the structure and function of the brain. This form of stress can cause an increase in myelin-producing cells and a decrease in neurons. Chronic stress reduces the amount of stem cells that grow into neurons, which may explain how it impacts learning and memory. Having said that, the neuronal network of a brain is continually changing due to plasticity. Chronic stress, as well as mindset and behaviour, are never resolved. The power of neuroplasticity allows to modify the shape and function of a brain throughout its lifespan.

=== Embodiment ===
The brain is further limited by its constraint within the body. The brain receives input from receptors on the body (e.g., somatosensory system, visual system, auditory system, etc.). These receptors provide the brain with a source of information. As a result, they manipulate the brain's neural activation patterns, and thus its structure, leading to constraining effects on the construction of representations in the mind. The sensory systems limit the possible information the brain can receive and therefore act as a filter. However, the brain may also interact with the environment through manipulation of the body (e.g., movement, changes in attention, etc.), thus manipulating the environment and the subsequent information received. Pro-activity while exploring the environment leads to altered experiences and consequently altered cognitive development.

=== Constructing and reconstructing schemas ===
The developmental path of mental concepts, our cognition, and schemas are changing throughout adolescence and into adulthood, thanks to plasticity. The cognitive frameworks that are built are reflections of the way the brain responds to its culture and the environment. Neural connectivity reaches its highest throughout the teenage years, suggesting that the conceptual frameworks we built during adolescence can be rewired throughout one's entire lifespan, as argued by the idea of dynamic enskillment. This is a hypothesis that attempts to prove the ductility of our minds and its capacity to form unlimited neural connections that shape or reshape our unconscious and conscious pattern of thought and the categories we have built in with us that play a role on our perceptions and interaction with the world. This hypothesis has been used as an attempt to debunk the idea that we are born with knowledge built within, providing supportive conclusions to the argument that we are born as blank slates. Gary Marcus's, The Birth of Mind, takes a position against the idea of tabula rasa, and argues that we are born with patterns of thought and information that has been accumulated innately. This idea is known as neo-nativism. Marcus's ideas account for evolutionary neuroscience in which he specifies that our prewired patterns of thought have evolved to be the way that they are. Marcus's ideas are incongruent with the idea of a plastic brain, because he states that there isn't a prewiring or rewiring that occurs in a person's cognition, but rather, there is a fixation and rigidness due to the genes and recipes they are born with. A prewired brain cannot be plastic. However, Marcus does believe that cognition can be developed and reprogrammed, but argues that that isn't the norm. This idea appeals on the weak side since it does not give account for the way the environment molds our thinking and cognition which shape our memory. Memories are the complete essence of constructing cognition. In Lisa Feldman Barrett's 7 and a Half Lessons about the Brain speaks of schemas in accordance to the affects that we have as a result of an external stimuli, not giving credibility to the stimuli, but to the way the brain and body are affected and react. She argues that the brain's reactions are on account of past experiences which allows for it to think quickly, which is the basis of schemas. Lisa, similar to Marcus, does give credibility to what's within the individual and molded within them since birth that affects our personal internal experiences. Neurconstructivism speaks of schemas as being a cortical specialty that rely on learning and experience for their forms that have been built in earlier years to be changed and rewired. Evidence for proof of this second-window(rewiring) has been made through proof of a second period of synaptic over-production that occurs in the teenage years, which allow for remolding the constraints of one's thoughts that have been wired during infancy. Plasticity is highly available in puberty and creates new models for an individual based on their biological interaction with the environment that are crucial for decision making, personality, and social behavior in later adulthood. This is one of the most crucial reasons teenagers are advised to stay away from alcohol and psychedelic that diminish their judgment and inhibit clarity and thinking. This second window made available through puberty should not be taken for granted because it is the brain the individual will enter with adulthood at 21. Alcohol diminishes the brain's capacity to form neural connections and suppresses specific activities and pathways of neurons. Alcohol attacks the frontal lobe, which is heightened in development in puberty and keeps growing till the age of 21. Research performed by neuroscientist Jay Giedd provides strong support for a second period of synaptic plasticity, and he did a case study on his own teenage kids. He reasons with poor decision making teenagers make due to their brains not being fully mature.

Support for the idea that the brain has a capacity to rewire have been found in a research conducted by Takashi Ohnishi have been made on musicians and non-musicians to test what parts of the brain are active during the playing of an Italian orchestra, and it had shown that non-musicians' right temporal lobe and the secondary area of the auditory cortex was activated compared to musicians' brains whose activity was in the left temporal cortex and in the left prefrontal cortex. This study provides support for plasticity and the way skills are intertwined with the working brain relying on neural connections to be built to target different parts of the brain. This study suggests that our schemas are rooted in different portions of our brains' processes and gives credibility for its grandiose diversity.

=== Ensocialment ===
While a person may manipulate the environment, the specific environment in which the person develops has highly constraining effects on the possible neural representations exhibited through a restriction of the possible physical and social experiences. For example, if a child is raised without a mother, the child cannot change his/her responses or actions to generate a mother. S/he may only work within the specified constraints of the environment in which s/he is born. If a child is born into poor conditions compared to a child who grew up in a middle class with exposure to athletic activities with family and friends is likely to stay distant from athletic joy throughout adulthood, since their cognition and happiness has been unaffected and not introduced to it as a child to fully grasp the happiness and necessity it causes throughout childhood. Therefore, neurconstructivism is also a contagion. The aforementioned examples are an asset to explaining the way our schemas have been sculpted and the immense affect they have on our everyday lives.

=== The nature of representations ===
All of the above constraints interact to form cognitive representations in the brain. The main principle is context dependence, as shaping occurs through competition and cooperation. Competition leads to the specialization of developing components which then forms new representations. Cooperation, on the other hand, leads to combinations of existing mental representations that allow existing knowledge to be reused. Construction of representations also depends on the exploration of the environment by the individual. However, the experiences derived from this pro-activity constrain the range of possible adaptations within the mental representations. Such progressive specialization arises from the constraints of the past and current learning environment. To alter representations, the environment demands improvements through small additions to the current mental state. This leads to partial instead of fixed representations that are assumed to occur in adults. Neuroconstructivism argues such end products do not exist. The brain's plasticity leads to ever-changing mental representations through individual proactivity and environmental interactions. Such a viewpoint implies that any current mental representations are the optimal outcome for a specified environment. For example, in developmental disorders like autism, atypical development arises because of adaptations to multiple interacting constraints, the same as normal development. However, the constraints differ and thus result in a different end-product. This view directly contrasts previous theories which assumed that disorders arise from isolated failures of particular functional modules.

== See also ==
- Constructivism (psychological school)
