= Faculty psychology =

Metaphysical Idea

Faculty psychology is the idea that the mind is separated into faculties or sections, and that each of these faculties is assigned to certain mental tasks. Some examples of the mental tasks assigned to these faculties include judgment, compassion, memory, attention, perception, and consciousness. For example, we can speak because we have the faculty of speech or we can think because we have the faculty of thought. Thomas Reid mentions over 43 faculties of the mind that work together as a whole. Additionally, faculty psychology claims that we are born with separate, innate human functions.

The views of faculty psychology are explicit in the psychological writings of the medieval scholastic theologians, such as Thomas Aquinas, as well as in Franz Joseph Gall's formulation of phrenology, albeit more implicitly. More recently faculty psychology has been revived by Jerry Fodor's concept of modularity of mind, the hypothesis that different modules autonomously manage sensory input as well as other mental functions.

Faculty psychology resembles localization of function, the claim that specific cognitive functions are performed in specific areas of the brain. For example, Broca's area is associated with language production and syntax, while the Wernicke's Area is associated with language comprehension and semantics. It is currently known that while the brain's functions are separate, they also work together in a localized function.

Additionally, faculty psychology depicts the mind as something similar to a muscle of the human body since both function the same way. The way of training a muscle is by repetitive and brutal training in order to adapt the muscle to the type of workout it is being put through. Putting the mind through intensive brain-exercising problems, presumably leads to greater intellectual capacity. This process is referred to engaging a ”mental discipline” that can be compared to athletic training. Like athletes who improve their running speed by strength training and improved motion techniques, the mind can presumably be trained to process information faster and reach deeper understanding by repeated engagement with complex mental tasks and increasingly challenging analytical exercises.

Some psychologists brand the comparison of the mind to muscle strengthening as a fallacy, but others think that it is a necessary philosophical point of departure to explain the apparent localized functions in particular areas of the brain. Many psychologists have moved on to newer psychological philosophies based on the study of the brain with the help of modern technology.

== Historical change ==
It is debatable to what extent the continuous mention of faculties throughout the history of psychology should be taken to indicate a continuity of the term's meaning. In medieval writings, psychological faculties were often intimately related to metaphysically-loaded conceptions of forces,, particularly to Aristotle's notion of an efficient cause. This is the view of faculties which is explicit in the works of Thomas Aquinas:

...knowledge of things in our intellect is not caused by any participation or influence of forms that are intelligible in act and that subsist by themselves, as was taught by the Platonists and certain other philosophers who followed them in this doctrine. No, the intellect acquires such knowledge from sensible objects, through the intermediacy of the senses. However, since the forms of objects in the sense faculties are particular, as we just said, they are intelligible not in act, but only in potency. For the intellect understands nothing but universals. But what is in potency is not reduced to act except by some agent. Hence there must be some agent that causes the species existing in the sense faculties to be intelligible in act. The possible intellect cannot perform this service, for it is in potency with respect to intelligible objects rather than active in rendering them intelligible. Therefore we must assume some other intellect, which will cause species that are intelligible in potency to become intelligible in act, just as light causes colors that are potentially visible to be actually visible. This faculty we call the agent intellect, which we would not have to postulate if the forms of things were intelligible in act, as the Platonists held.

— Compendium Theologiae, Chapter 83, translated by Cyril Vollert, S.J.

By the 19th century, the founders of experimental psychology had a very different view of faculties. In this period, introspection was well-regarded by many as one tools among others for the investigation of mental life. In his Principles of Physiological Psychology, Wilhelm Wundt insisted that faculties were nothing but descriptive class concepts, meant to denote classes of mental events that could be discerned in introspection, but which never actually appeared in isolation. He took caution in insisting that older, metaphysical conceptions of faculties must be guarded against and that the scientist's tasks of classification and explanation must be kept distinct:

It is probable that the mental faculties stood originally not merely for different parts of the field of internal experience, but for as many different beings; though the relation of these to the total being, the mind or spirit, was not conceived of in any very definite way. But the hypostatization of these concepts lies so far back in the remote past, and the mythological interpretation of nature is so alien to our modes of thought, that there is no need here to warn the reader against a too great credulity in the matter of metaphysical substances. Nevertheless, there is one legacy that has come down to modem science from the mythopoeic age. All the concepts that we mentioned just now have retained a trace of the mythological concept of force; they are not regarded simply as -what they really are- class designations of certain departments of the inner experience but are oftentimes taken to be forced, by whose means the various phenomena are produced. Understanding is looked upon as the force that enables us to perceive truth; memory is the force that stores up ideas for future use; and so on. On the other hand, the effects of these different 'forces' manifest themselves so irregularly that they hardly seem to be forced in the proper sense of the word; and so the phrase 'mental faculties' came in to remove all objections. A faculty, as its derivation indicates, is not a force that must operate, necessarily and immutably, but only a force that may operate. The influence of the mythological concept of force is here as plain as it could well be; for the prototype of the operation of force as faculty is, obviously, to be found in human action. The original significance of faculty is that of a being that acts. Here, therefore, in the first formation of psychological concepts, we have the germ of that confusion of classification with explanation which is one of the besetting sins of empirical psychology.

— Principles of Physiological Psychology, vol.1, pp.18-29, translated by Edward B. Titchener

It was in this and the ensuing period that faculty psychology came to be sharply distinguished from the act psychology promoted by Franz Brentano—whereas the two are barely distinguished in Aquinas, for example.

== Faculty psychology in other philosophical ideas ==
The faculty psychology idea emerges either directly or indirectly in discussions of other philosophical ideas such as innatism, nativism, empiricism and associationism.

== Explanatory metaphors ==
In Seven and a Half Lessons About the Brain by Lisa Feldman Barrett, Barrett describes faculty psychology using a metaphor that equates the brain to a (multi-tool) pocketknife. Specifically, the metaphor equates each tool of a multi-tool pocketknife with each section of the brain, and like the tools, the sections of the brain serve particular purposes.
