= Direct negative evidence =

Language acquisition term

Direct negative evidence is a term used in the study of the acquisition of language. It describes the attempts of competent speakers of a language to guide the grammatical use of novice speakers, such as children.

== Definition ==
Negative evidence in language acquisition consists of evidence that demonstrates which grammatical constructions in a language are ungrammatical. Furthermore, Saxton (1997) asserts that negative evidence supplies the " correct adult model" for novice speakers to avoid future grammatical mishaps. Negative evidence corrections, in whatever form they appear, necessarily follow immediately after an incorrect, often ungrammatical, utterance. Note that although parents often understand their children, and these production mistakes aren't usually egregious enough for the parent to not be able to correct it, negative evidence deals with the conventional standards of grammar in a language and the correct model of grammar structures, rather than communicative ones.

Direct negative evidence differs from indirect negative evidence in that it is explicitly presented to a language learner (for example, a child might be corrected by a parent) whereas indirect negative evidence is inferred from the absence of ungrammatical utterances in a given language. Though it is generally agreed that there is positive evidence (i.e. evidence that demonstrates grammatical linguistic constructions) in the language input, there is a dearth of direct negative evidence in the general language learner input since most native or veteran speakers produce grammatical as opposed to ungrammatical speech.

== "No Negative Evidence" Problem ==
One of the difficulties surrounding language acquisition is that the language input is not rich enough for children to develop a correct grammar, otherwise referred to as the argument of the poverty of the stimulus. This is a commonly held position by nativists, who believe that there are innate mechanisms which facilitate language learning. The central idea of the poverty of the stimulus argument is that children could have multiple hypotheses about aspects of their grammar which are distinguishable only by direct negative evidence (or by hearing ungrammatical sentences and recognizing those sentences as ungrammatical). Supporters of the poverty of the stimulus argument then assert that because the negative evidence that is needed to learn language by the input alone does not exist, children cannot learn certain aspects of grammar from the input alone, and there must be some aspects of grammar which involve innate mechanisms.

The view that there is "no negative evidence" in the input is held by a number of researchers in the field of language acquisition who assert that if children are to learn language, then they must be able to learn language by solely examining the positive evidence that they do receive from the input since there is not enough negative evidence to be useful for language learning. Some propose that direct negative evidence would be necessary for children to develop a fully formed grammar, so it has also often been argued that children cannot learn a language by only receiving positive evidence, and that therefore there must be innate constraints on their biology which would allow them to learn language.

== Examples of Direct Negative Evidence ==
Implicit negative evidence is a type of corrective feedback in which parental responses to a child's incorrect statements is indicative of the utterance's ungrammaticality. It is argued that there is a shortage of explicit direct negative evidence in the general input of learners. However, others have conducted studies that demonstrate that there is suitable implicit direct negative evidence present in parental responses to their children. There have been a number of studies regarding this type of evidence in which researchers have demonstrated that parents do respond differently when children utter grammatical or ungrammatical utterances.

There are a number of applications of implicit direct negative evidence which parents utilize in responses to ungrammatical – not necessarily incorrect or unintelligible – utterances. Parents intend to correct their children with these corrective techniques. Recasts are one such kind of evidence, in which a parent "expands, deletes, permutes, or otherwise changes [a child's utterance] while maintaining significant overlap in meaning." Sometimes parents recast children's sentences after children produce ungrammatical utterances, and some believe that children use this evidence to correct mistakes in their grammar, even though recasts can also occur after children construct grammatical utterances. One theory for why the children even react to the negative feed back is that they trust the grammar judgements of adults – given adults are older and more experienced with language, their word choice must be credible and that intended meaning children want to convey has to follow the language constraints imposed by those adults. Experiments have been conducted which have demonstrated that children improve in grammatical forms when parents provide them with any type of immediate implicit direct negative evidence, including recasts, which supports some scholars' claims that direct negative evidence does have an associable presence in learner's grammar. Similar studies have been conducted demonstrating that when parents recast children's morphological errors, children sometimes attempt to correct their initial errors. Such conclusions have received some as many such studies do not specify which types of utterances qualify as recasts and why children only pay attention to certain kinds of recasts and not others.

Chouinard conducted a follow up study in which she examined how children respond to parental reformulation (a type of negative evidence in which parents correct an ungrammatical utterance of a child), and she found that children are highly attentive to parental responses and that children respond to this kind of implicit correction in predictable ways. It is argued that parents frequently reformulate children's ungrammatical utterances, usually in an effort to clarify the child's meaning, though not all of the reformulations are intended to correct children's speech errors, such as cases where parents expand a child's utterance to seek additional information. Reformulations are in direct contrast to the child-utterance, which contained an error. The correction takes place in the same location as the error, thus providing the child with evidence for where they made an error. It is the presence of the reformulations as well as the high percentage of correct parental speech that allows children to learn. Children tend to directly respond to these reformulations by either affirming the reformulation or disagreeing with their parent if the parent misunderstood the child's intended meaning. As Levine's study demonstrates that children attend to even parental responses which are non-corrective, other researchers have also conducted studies that demonstrate that children do not need feedback which corrects grammatical errors in order to learn.

=== Arguments Against Implicit Direct Negative Evidence ===
Though there have been a number of studies that support the hypothesis that children can use the implicit negative evidence that exists in the input, there have also been studies which stand in stark contrast to this hypothesis. Some linguists, such as Gary Marcus, argue that the implicit negative evidence in the input is insufficient for children to learn the correct grammar of their language. Marcus and others, such as Hendriks and Baker, believe negative evidence is a weak form of evidence because children gradually learn from a limited corpus of correct or incorrect utterances that is grammatical or ungrammatical, which undermines the import of direct negative evidence to begin with. Children do not receive negative reactions for each of their negative utterances. There isn't enough of a correlation between negative evidence from parents to the occurrence of ungrammatical utterances from their children for infant learners to be able to base grammatically on negative evidence, as has been concluded in previous corpus studies. According to Morgan, Bonamo & Travis (1995), there is no evidence that recasts would dissuade a child from his or her ungrammatical utterances. They argue that children may interpret a recast simply as an alternative way to say something and what they had just said is equally valid.

Positive evidence from a parent can immediately be assumed to be grammatical, yet not every parents will correct every child error and some children may even benefit from fewer constraints, which diminishes the necessity of direct negative evidence. In spite of the inconsistencies of the negative evidence in the input, all children eventually arrive at a correct grammar which supports the fact that the negative evidence cannot account for a child's ability to learn a grammar since not all children receive the same negative evidence. To the contrary, Marcus states that the more positive evidence for irregular forms a child is exposed to the less likely they are to overgeneralize grammatical concepts. He explains this as a function of an inherent mechanism and the child can suppress the grammatical rule in cases where it does not apply. Finally, Marcus argues that a child can easily acquire grammatical rules, but cannot receive direct feedback from a parent in every case to determine where irregularities occur, thus making implicit negative evidence practically useless for a language learner.
