= Domain-general learning =

Theory of cognitive development

Domain-general learning theories of development suggest that humans are born with mechanisms in the brain that exist to support and guide learning on a broad level, regardless of the type of information being learned. Domain-general learning theories also recognize that although learning different types of new information may be processed in the same way and in the same areas of the brain, different domains also function interdependently. Because these generalized domains work together, skills developed from one learned activity may translate into benefits with skills not yet learned. Another facet of domain-general learning theories is that knowledge within domains is cumulative, and builds under these domains over time to contribute to our greater knowledge structure. Psychologists whose theories align with domain-general framework include developmental psychologist Jean Piaget, who theorized that people develop a global knowledge structure which contains cohesive, whole knowledge internalized from experience, and psychologist Charles Spearman, whose work led to a theory on the existence of a single factor accounting for all general cognitive ability.

Domain-general learning theories are in direct opposition to domain-specific learning theories, also sometimes called theories of Modularity. Domain-specific learning theories posit that humans learn different types of information differently, and have distinctions within the brain for many of these domains. Domain-specific learning theorists also assert that these neural domains are independent, purposed solely for the acquisition of one skill (i.e. facial recognition or mathematics), and may not provide direct benefits in the learning of other, unrelated skills.

== Related Theories ==
=== Piaget’s Theory of Cognitive Development ===
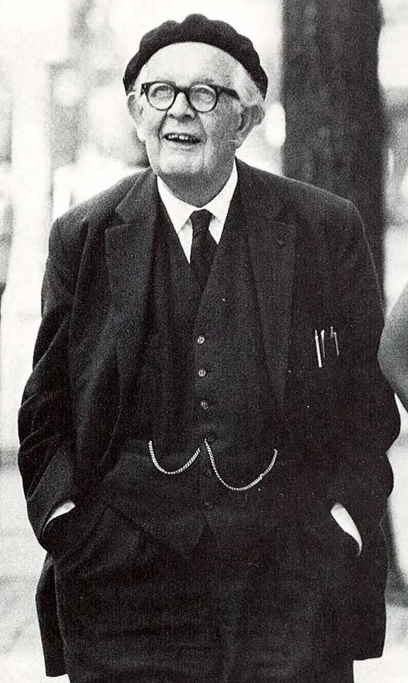
Jean Piaget

Developmental psychologist, Jean Piaget, theorized that one's cognitive ability, or intelligence – defined as the ability to adapt to all aspects of reality – evolves through a series of four qualitatively distinct stages (the sensorimotor, pre-operational, concrete operational and formal operational stages). Piaget's theory describes three core cognitive processes that serve as mechanisms for transitioning from one stage to the next.

Piaget's core processes for developmental change:

- Assimilation: The process of transforming new information so that it fits with ones' existing way of thinking.
- Accommodation: The process of adapting ones' thinking to account for new experiences.
- Equilibration: The process by which one integrates their knowledge about the world into one unified whole.

However, these processes are not the only processes responsible for progressing through Piaget's developmental stages. Each stage is differentiated based upon the types of conceptual content that can be mastered within it. Piaget's theory holds that transitioning from one stage of development to the next is not only a result of assimilation, accommodation, and equilibration, but also a result of developmental changes in domain-general mechanisms. As humans mature, various domain-general mechanisms become more sophisticated, and thus, according to Piaget, allow for growth in cognitive functioning.

For example, Piaget's theory notes that the humans transition into the concrete operation stage of cognitive development when they acquire the ability to take perspective, and no longer have egocentric thinking (a characteristic of the pre-operational stage). This change can be viewed as the result of developmental changes in information processing capacity. Information processing is a mechanism that is used across many different domains of cognitive functioning, and thus can be seen as a domain-general mechanism.

=== Psychometric Theories of Intelligence ===
Psychometric analysis of measurements of human cognitive abilities (intelligence) may suggest that there is a single underlying mechanism that impacts how humans learn. In the early 20th century, Charles Spearman noticed that children's scores on different measures of cognitive abilities were positively correlated. Spearman believed that these correlations could be attributed to a general mental ability or process that is utilized across all cognitive tasks. Spearman labeled this general mental ability as the g factor, and believed g could represent an individual's overall cognitive functioning. The presence of this g factor across different cognitive measures is well-established and uncontroversial in statistical research. It may be that this g factor highlights domain-general learning (cognitive mechanisms involved in all cognition), and that this general learning accounts for the positive correlations across seemingly different cognitive tasks. There currently is no consensus to what causes the positive correlations.

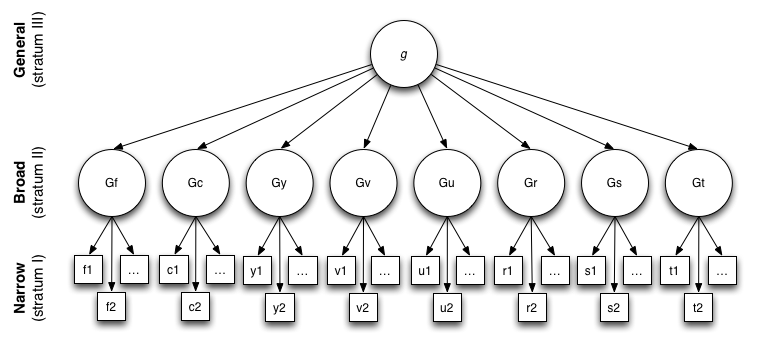
An illustration of John B. Carroll's three stratum theory, an influential contemporary model of cognitive abilities. The broad abilities recognized by the model are fluid intelligence (Gf), crystallized intelligence (Gc), general memory and learning (Gy), broad visual perception (Gv), broad auditory perception (Gu), broad retrieval ability (Gr), broad cognitive speediness (Gs), and processing speed (Gt). Carroll regarded the broad abilities as different "flavors" of g.

Spearman's work was expanded upon by Raymond B. Cattell, who broke g into two broad abilities: fluid intelligence (Gf) and crystallized intelligence (Gc). Cattell's student, John Horn, added additional broad abilities to Cattell's model of intelligence. In 1993, John B. Carroll added more specificity to Cattell and Horn's Gf-Gc model by adding a third layer of human intelligence factors. Carroll named these factors “narrow abilities”. Narrow abilities are described as abilities that do not correlate with skills outside their domain, following more along the lines of domain-specific learning theories.

Despite breaking g into more specific areas, or domains of intelligence, Carroll maintained that a single general ability was essential to intelligence theories. This suggests that Carroll, to some extent, believed cognitive abilities were domain-general.

== Skills That May Be Acquired via Domain-General Mechanisms ==
As discussed above, Piaget's theory of cognitive development posits that periods of major developmental change come about due to maturation of domain-general cognitive mechanisms. However, although Piaget's theory of cognitive development can be credited with establishing the field of cognitive development, some aspects of his theory have not withstood the test of time.

Despite this, researchers that call themselves "neo-Piagetians" have often focused on the role domain-general cognitive processes in constraining cognitive development. It had been found that many skills humans acquire require domain-general mechanisms rather than highly specialized cognitive mechanisms for development. Namely, memory, executive functioning, and language development.

=== Memory ===
One theory of memory development suggests that basic (domain-general) memory processes become more superior through maturation. In this theory, basic memory processes are frequently used, rapidly executed memory activities. These activities include: association, generalization, recognition, and recall. The basic processes theory of memory development states that these memory processes underlie all cognition, as it holds that all more complex cognitive activities are built by combining these basic processes in different ways. Thus, these memory basic processes can be seen as domain-general processes that can be applied across various domains.

Domain general processes in memory development:

- Association is the most basic memory process. The ability to associate stimuli with responses is present from birth.
- Generalization is the tendency to respond in the same way to different but similar stimuli
- Recognition describes a cognitive process that matches information from a stimulus with information retrieved from memory
- Recall is the mental process of retrieval of information from the past

In addition to these general processes, working Memory in particular has been extensively studied as it relates and functions as a domain-general mechanism to constraints on cognitive development. For example, researchers believe that with maturation, one is able to hold more complex structures in their working memory, which results in an increase of possible computations that underlie inference and learning. Thus, working memory can be viewed as a domain-general mechanism that aids development across many different domains.

=== Executive Functions ===
Researchers have expanded the search for domain-general mechanisms that underlie cognitive development beyond working memory. The advancement in cognitive neuroscience technology is credited as making this expansion possible. Within the last decade, researchers have begun to focus on a group of cognitive mechanisms, collectively named Executive Functions. Mechanisms commonly labeled executive functions include: working memory, inhibition, set shifting, as well as higher-order mechanisms that involve combinations of the prior (planning, problem-solving, reasoning).

Piagetian tasks – tasks that measure behaviors that relate to cognitive abilities associated with Piaget's developmental stages – have been used in studies of cognitive neuroscience to investigate whether executive functions relate to cognitive development. Such studies revealed that the maturation of the prefrontal cortex (an area of the brain identified to underlie the development of executive functions such as working memory and inhibition) may relate to success on tasks that measure the Piagetian concept of object permanence. Thus, this research supports Piaget's notion that developmental changes in domain-general mechanisms promote cognitive development.

=== Language ===
The general cognitive processes perspective of language development emphasizes characteristics of the language learner as the source of development. The general cognitive processes perspective states that the broad cognitive processes are sufficient for a child to learn new words. These broad cognitive processes include: attending, perceiving, and remembering. Important to this perspective is the idea that such cognitive processes are domain-general, and are applied to learning many different kinds of information in addition to benefiting word acquisition. This perspective contrasts the grammatical cues perspective, which emphasizes characteristics of the language input as a source of development. Furthermore, the general cognitive processes perspective also contrasts the constraints perspective of language development, in which children are said to be able to learn many words quickly because of constraints that are specialized for language learning.

== Opposing Theories ==
The relationship between domain general learning and domain specific learning (also known as the modularity debate or modularity of mind) has been an ongoing debate for evolutionary psychologists.

The modularity of mind or modularity debate states that the brain is constructed of neural structures (or modules) which have distinct functions. Jerry Fodor, an American philosopher and cognitive scientist, stated in his 1983 book that brain modules are specialized and may only operate on certain kinds of inputs. According to Fodor, a module is defined as “functionally specialized cognitive systems”. These modules are said to be mostly independent, develop on different timetables, and are influenced by a variety of different experiences an individual may have. Some argue that Piaget's domain general theory of learning undermines the influence of socio-cultural factors on an individual's development. More specifically, the theory does not explain the influence of parental nurture and social interactions on human development.

Domain-specific learning is a theory in developmental psychology that says the development of one set of skills is independent from the development of other types of skills. This theory suggests that training or practice in one area may not influence another. Domain-specificity has been defined by Frankenhuis and Ploeger as that “a given cognitive mechanism accepts, or is specialized to operate on, only a specific class of information”. Furthermore, domain-specific learning prescribes different learning activities for students in order to meet required learning outcomes.

Modern cognitive psychologists suggest a more complex relationship between domain-generality and domain-specificity in the brain. Current research suggests these networks may exist together in the brain, and the extent to which they function in tandem may vary by task and skill-level.

== Possible Applications ==
=== Workplaces ===
Technology advancements and changes in the labor market show the need for workers/employees to be adaptive. This may suggest that school curricular should incorporate activities focusing on developing the necessary skills for dynamic environments. People tend to use domain-general learning processes when initially learning how to perform and complete certain tasks, and less so once these tasks become extensively practiced.

=== Early Childhood Education ===
Problem solving is considered to be an individual's ability to partake in cognitive processing in order to understand and solve problems where a solution may not be immediately apparent. Domain-specific problem solving skills may provide students with narrow knowledge and abilities. Because of this, school teachers, policy makers and curriculum developers may find it beneficial to incorporate domain general skills (such as time management, teamwork or leadership) in relation to problem solving into school curriculum. Domain general problem solving provides students with cross-curricular skills and strategies that can be transferred to multiple different situations/environments/domains. Examples of cross-curricular skills include, but are not limited to: information processing, self-regulation and decision making.

=== Language Development ===
Additionally, linguistic knowledge and language development are examples of domain-general skills. Infants can learn rules and identify patterns in stimuli which may imply learning and generalizable knowledge. This means parents of young children and early childhood educators may want to consider its application while supporting language development.

== See also ==
- Cognition
- Epistemology
- Instructional theory
- Learning
- Learning theory (education)
- Neuroscience
- Modularity of mind
- Constructivism
- Neuroconstructivism
- Piaget's theory of cognitive development
- Poverty of the stimulus
