= Innateness hypothesis =

Hypothesis that humans are born with knowledge of linguistic structure

In linguistics, the innateness hypothesis, also known as the nativist hypothesis, holds that humans are born with at least some knowledge of linguistic structure. On this hypothesis, language acquisition involves filling in the details of an innate blueprint rather than being an entirely inductive process. The hypothesis is one of the cornerstones of generative grammar and related approaches in linguistics. Arguments in favour include the poverty of the stimulus, the universality of language acquisition, as well as experimental studies on learning and learnability. However, these arguments have been criticized, and the hypothesis is widely rejected in other traditions such as usage-based linguistics. The term was coined by Hilary Putnam in reference to the views of Noam Chomsky.

== Linguistic nativism ==
Linguistic nativism is the hypothesis that humans are born with some knowledge of language. It is intended as an explanation for the fact that children are reliably able to accurately acquire enormously complex linguistic structures within a short period of time. The central argument in favour of nativism is the poverty of the stimulus. Additional arguments come from the fact that language acquisition among children occurs in ordered developmental stages and that adult learners – having passed the critical age for language acquisition – are typically unable to acquire native-like proficiency in a second language.

=== Poverty of the stimulus ===
Poverty of the stimulus arguments claim that the evidence a child receives during language acquisition is not sufficient to determine the eventual linguistic output. For instance, in one such argument formulated by Noam Chomsky, he argued that children's experiences with polar questions in languages such as English language would not favor the actual subject–auxiliary inversion rule over a hypothetical one which pertains to linear order rather than hierarchical structure.

Pullum and Scholz summarised the properties of a child's environment. They identified properties of positivity, degeneracy, incompleteness and idiosyncrasy. Under positivity, they assert that children are only exposed to positive linguistic data. Moreover, there is lack in negative data that aids a child in identifying ungrammatical sentences that are unacceptable in the language. It is also claimed that children are unable to acquire a language with positive evidence alone. In addition, under degeneracy, it is stated that children are often exposed to linguistic data that are erroneous. This is supported by Zohari, who states that in adult speech, erroneous utterances that include speech slips, ungrammatical sentences, incomplete sentences, etc. are often observed. Furthermore, the linguistic data each child is exposed to is different (i.e. idiosyncrasy) and there are many utterances that a child might not have heard (i.e. incompleteness). However, despite the properties mentioned above, children would eventually be able to deliver a linguistic output that is similar to the target language within a relatively short amount of time. In contrast, when placed in certain environments, other organisms are unable to attain the language mastery humans have reached.

The validity of poverty of stimulus arguments is not universally accepted, and is the subject of ongoing debate.

=== Critical-period hypothesis ===
The critical-period hypothesis of the linguist Eric Lenneberg states that full native competence in acquiring a language can only be achieved during an optimal period. This hypothesis supports the innateness hypothesis about the biological innateness of linguistic competence. Lenneberg expressed that age plays a salient role in the ability to acquire language. According to him, a child before the age of two will not sufficiently acquire language, while development of full native competence in a language must occur before the onset of puberty. This suggests that language is innate and occurs through development instead of through feedback from the environment. As a result, should a child not hear any language during this period, the child would not be able to learn nor be able to speak. This hypothesis is also said to explain why adults do not acquire languages as well as children.

The case of the feral child Genie provides evidence for the critical-period hypothesis. When discovered, she was without language. Genie's subsequent language-acquisition process was studied, whereby her linguistic performance, cognitive and emotional development was deemed abnormal. Genie was said to have right-hemisphere language, resembling other cases where language was acquired outside of the "critical period". This would lend support to Lenneberg's hypothesis. Moreover, some saw the case of Genie as a support to the innateness hypothesis. When the LAD is not triggered during the critical period, the natural process of language acquisition cannot be reached. However, Genie's case is complex and controversial. It has been argued that it does not support linguistic innateness. Some have asserted that there is at least a possible degree of first-language acquisition beyond the critical period. Moreover, emotional and cognitive deprivation may have also played a part in Genie's linguistic and cognitive difficulties.

The development of the Nicaraguan sign language (NSL) by students in a school for the deaf also lends evidence to the critical-period hypothesis. Initially a pidgin sign language with simple grammar, it had large grammatical differences and variations across signers. Eventually, the pidgin became a full-fledged language (like a creole) as younger signers developed a significantly more grammatically-structured and regular system such as specific grammatical structures Often, the differences in abilities between younger and older students learning to use sign language are said to suggest evidence for a critical period. The spontaneity of the development of NSL also suggests that there is an innate element to the process of language learning.

Nonetheless, the critical-period hypothesis in relation to language acquisition is also widely debated. Other research has also indicated that any age effects depend largely on the opportunities for learning, learning situations and how significant the initial exposure is.

=== Universal grammar ===
The term universal grammar refers to the set of constraints on what a possible human language could be. Within approaches that accept universal grammar, language acquisition is viewed as a process of using sensory input to filter through the set of possible grammars that conform to UG.

=== Language acquisition device ===
According to Chomsky, humans are born with a set of language-learning tools referred to as the LAD (language acquisition device). The LAD is an abstract part of the human mind which houses the ability for humans to acquire and produce language. Chomsky proposed that children are able to derive rules of a language through hypothesis testing because they are equipped with a LAD. The LAD then transforms these rules into basic grammar. Hence, according to Chomsky, the LAD explains why children seem to have the innate ability to acquire a language and accounts for why no explicit teaching is required for a child to acquire a language.

== Linguistic empiricism ==
Empiricism is the theory that all knowledge is based on experience derived from the senses. Empiricists only study observable behaviour instead of unobservable mental representations, states and processes. They claim that sense and experience is the ultimate source of all concepts and knowledge. On the other hand, linguistic empiricism is a perspective where language is entirely learned. These data-driven theorists also support that children do not have linguistically-specific knowledge at birth. Language and grammar are only learned through exposure and accumulated experience. This is also called the "nurture" perspective as opposed to the "nature" perspective (linguistic nativism).

Chomsky's innateness hypothesis contradicts the belief by John Locke that our knowledge, including language, cannot be innate and is instead derived from experience. Geoffrey Sampson also showed the same stand by stating that "Our languages are not inborn but are learned wholly with experience." Empiricists have criticised concepts like generative grammar that support linguistic nativism. In fact, some would argue that "language structure" is created through language use. Moreover, they assert that theories like the LAD are unsupported by empirical evidence.

=== Arguments ===
Contrastive analyses about the innateness hypothesis have been done by Jacek Fisiak in 1980. According to Fisiak's analysis, Putnam, Hiż and Goodman criticized Chomsky's innate hypothesis by stating that:

1. The fact that languages have similar properties is common and natural. There is no necessity to appeal to innate concepts for the explanation of this fact. Goodman also expressed that claims about language universals are dubious. He argues that it is not surprising that languages in the world will coincidentally have features in common. Therefore, the claim that common features, which have been identified as natural 'language universals', should not be supported.
2. The hypothesis cannot be supported by empirical evidence.

It is hard to explain what it is for someone to have an innate concept since empirical evidence to support this theory is hard to find. In other words, there is no way to falsify the theory unless empirical evidence is found.

Over the years, many theories that are against language innateness have been developed to account for language acquisition. Many have championed that human beings learn language through experience with some leaning towards children being equipped with learning mechanisms while others suggesting that social situations or cognitive capacities can account for language learning.

Bates and Elman summarised a research conducted by Saffran, Aslin and Newport that supports that learning is "a purely inductive, statistically driven process". In the research, it was found that 8 month old infants were able to use simple statistics to identify word boundaries in speech. The results of the research highlight that language acquisition is a process of learning through statistical means. Moreover, it raises the possibility that infants possess experience-dependent mechanisms that allow for word segmentation and acquisition of other aspects of language. As a result, Bates and Elman found that this contradicts the extensive view that human beings are unable and cannot utilize generalized statistical procedures for language acquisition. This is empirical evidence for linguistic empiricism, thereby going against the innateness hypothesis.

Michael Tomasello's findings highlight the significance of a usage-based theory of language acquisition and indicates that there is a relation between cognitive and social skills with linguistic competence. This shows the importance of the role of experience in language acquisition. By empirically studying the developmental stages of child language acquisition, he argues that children have specific cognitive capacities at birth that promote growth in linguistic competence and specific interpersonal abilities that aid language learning. However, he emphasised that this does not prove that language is innate. In addition, his experiments indicate that children's awareness and understanding of the intentional communicative cues displayed by others is a salient social cognitive skill that determines their ability to learn words. Tomasello also stated that young children's initial multi-word productions are very concrete as they are based on specific words and phrases instead of innate and abstract linguistic categories. Hence, this would explain why grammar development is progressive and word-specific.

Geoffrey Sampson also supports that the "richness of the environment" plays a role in language acquisition. For example, Sampson observed that not only human beings but all species are capable of recognizing speech. This ability indicates that a child is equipped with the capacity for normalisation which plays a fundamental role in acquiring the phonology of a language. Therefore, he contends that a child is born with the ability to learn and this is through testing and guessing instead of the innate ability that nativists support.

== See also ==
- Language acquisition
- Psychological nativism
- Statistical learning in language acquisition
- Cognitive psychology
