= Corrective feedback =

Practice in the field of learning and achievement

Corrective feedback is a frequently-used practice in the field of learning and achievement. It typically involves a learner receiving either formal or informal feedback on their understanding or performance on various tasks by an agent such as teacher, coach, employer or peer(s). To successfully deliver corrective feedback, it needs to be nonevaluative, supportive, timely, and specific.

== Examples of corrective feedback ==
Various types of corrective feedback exist, each with its own appropriate uses. Corrective feedback begins in early childhood with motherese, in which a parent or caregiver provides subtle corrections of a young child's spoken errors. Such feedback, known as a recast, often leads to the child repeating their utterance correctly (or with fewer errors) in imitation of the parent's model.

At the preschool or kindergarten level, corrective feedback is usually informal and verbal. Such feedback is common in the higher grades, as well, but, as students progress through the grades, it is conventional practice for their teachers to provide written corrections on their work samples or on separate feedback sheets. Written and oral feedback can be provided in the form of sentences (i.e., anecdotal feedback) describing the work's merits and weaknesses, in which case a typical practice involves the teacher pointing out three strengths and one "next step" for future improvement. Written feedback in particular can involve a certain amount of "markup" on the student's work, with errors underlined or circled and corrections inserted or noted in the margins.

Feedback can also be recorded as a score, such as a percentage, a letter grade, or an achievement level defined by a specific reference. Grades can be based on the teacher's overall impression of the work, but assessment based on explicit criteria is increasingly common. An example of such holistic assessment is a rubric. A typical rubric is a chart in the form of a grid that lists several criteria, performance indicators, and achievement levels. For example, a rubric for an essay-writing assignment may include "grammar" as one of its criteria; the performance indicator for an achievement level of "B" in grammar may be, "The essay contains several minor grammatical errors" while the performance indicator for an achievement level of "A" in grammar may be, "The essay contains no grammatical errors." Such rubrics enable students to see their strengths and weaknesses vis-à-vis the various criteria.

This is in contrast to insults, which are telling someone that they are not good enough without explaining why, and are not examples of corrective feedback.

== Amount of corrective feedback ==
In the higher grades, corrections can become more numerous or more nuanced, although the frequency of corrections varies from teacher to teacher. Such corrections may be random in an effort to communicate to the student the range of errors made. Alternatively, corrections may be focused on a set of selected error types. For instance, teachers sometimes focus on correcting basic errors first in the hope of helping students overcome them promptly in order to address more complicated errors in subsequent assignments. Teachers may correct one, several, or even all instances of a particular error.

Some debate exists as to the number of total corrections that teachers should make on a given piece of work. Teachers who make voluminous corrections give a "true" sense of the extent to which students require remediation, but such feedback can be overwhelming. If students take such feedback to heart, they may see their performance as a failure, thus injuring their self-image and confidence. Students might then negate such feedback and dismiss it as overly critical, or they might fear that the teacher is biased against them personally. In contrast, teachers who make sparse corrections may better enable their students to focus on improving in one or a few key areas, but the omission of other helpful corrections may be detrimental to their students' progress in the long run. Specifically, students who make certain errors might be led to perceive that they are not making errors at all, or that those errors are not significant enough to warrant the effort required to re-learn the concepts involved and avoid similar errors in the future.

== Feedback as a management tool ==
In the business world, feedback can be used as motivational tool as well as a coaching one. Best practice of feedback in the workplace consist of

- Specific and timely, ideally using a recent example, or given on the spot.
- Objective as possible (e.g. "here's what happened, and this is the perception I had"), rather than a vague or interpretative statement.
- Positive feedback about things employee did that added value or impressed the manager.

== Technology-mediated feedback ==
Feedback systems can also provide corrective feedback. Unlike teachers or peers, who may take days or even weeks to provide feedback on an assignment, technology-mediated feedback can provide timely feedback, which is often cited as a key factor in its positive reception by students. Moreover, software systems are immune to accusations of personal bias. Due to their excellent information-processing abilities, software systems track the types of errors made, rank them according to frequency, and redirect students to focus on those errors predefined as most in need of attention. Platforms such as OnTask help instructors to craft customized feedback messages to students. However, feedback does not automatically improve student learning. It is important to understand how students perceive it and how they turn the information they have been given to action.

== Alternative forms of corrective feedback ==
In light of the delicate balancing act between giving too much or too little corrective feedback, a number of alternative forms of feedback exist which can help students better identify and avoid errors. Sometimes, though, a change of attitude suffices. Students who do not take well to corrective feedback may need to be persuaded that a greater amount of feedback than they would have expected may, indeed, be quite helpful to them in the long run. On the other side of the coin, teachers who previously felt compelled to correct as many errors as possible in order to "help" their students to the utmost extent might decide that it is better to focus students' attention on correcting the most glaring errors rather than marking up all errors, which can be exhausting for both parties. Indeed, the field of second language acquisition has been witnessing a shift by teachers towards a greater focus on fluency - i.e., the ability to write and speak at a natural, productive pace - rather than nitpicking over matters of form, such as spelling or punctuation. By way of analogy, even in the field of mathematics, which is traditionally seen as one in which the avoidance of errors is critical, there has been an increased focus on creative problem-solving and mental estimation in light of the ubiquity of technologies, such as spreadsheets and calculators, that aid in verifying accuracy.

By virtue of their training and experience in a particular field, teachers may be the most authoritative source of corrective feedback, but, under certain circumstances, there may be other sources of feedback that are more successful. As mentioned previously, peers can be quite helpful to each other, especially in the case of more proficient peers helping their more needy counterparts. Care needs to be taken, however, to ensure that peers are not overly critical of one another. Therefore, teachers may instruct students to limit the amount of negative feedback while ensuring a sufficient amount of positive feedback.

When it comes to grading school work or papers, it is important to offer comments and suggestions that will improve the student's ability and allow them to grow. Some suggestions to be effective in doing so have been offered by instructors and can be summarized as follows:

- Include the most pertinent comments where the student will be most likely to see them, such as on the first page. Students often react first to the number of comments on the paper, looking to see how much the instructor "bled" on their papers. Consequently, they may not even read overall comments that appear at the end.
- Instructors must balance the positive and negative comments, remembering the importance of positive feedback. It motivates students, is essential to improvement, and builds confidence. If students are told why something is good, they can do more of it subsequently. Papers lacking any positive feedback tend to lead to poor student morale.
- Closely related is the overall tone of the comments. Instructors need to keep the tone professional. Constructive criticism goes a long way, but destructive criticism goes an even longer way. Once someone destroys your self-confidence as a writer, it is almost impossible to write well.
- The solution to "over commenting" is to separate the mechanical comments and the substantive comments. The mechanical comments encourage the student to see the paper as a fixed piece that just needs some editing. The substantive comments, however, suggest that the student still needs to develop the meaning by doing more research.
- When commenting on students' papers, think of the audience and purpose. An instructor's job is to reach students to help them learn and grow. If the feedback does not accomplish this goal, then it does not matter how much time and effort are put into the papers.
- Notes in the margins of the papers tend to be sketchy. With little room in the margins, instructors use more underlining, coding, and abbreviating. Many marginal notes simply label a problem without further explanation or example. For instance, an instructor writes in, "There are stronger works for your POV" on papers not thinking that POV (for point of view) may be an unfamiliar acronym. Not only does this feedback puzzle and frustrate students, it does not help them improve.

Informal teacher-student interactions and written comments without grades are also alternatives to the more common practice of formal, written feedback. Such forms of feedback are typically formative, not summative - i.e., they are intended to help students develop, not merely to grade or rank their performance on a task. They can be quite corrective in nature, but the absence of a summative grade can reduce student anxiety and encourage risk-taking, as students perceive their errors merely as part of a work in progress.

A newer form of corrective feedback is IF-AT forms. The Immediate Feedback Assessment Technique, also known as the IF-AT, is a testing system that transforms traditional multiple-choice testing into an interactive learning opportunity for students and a more informative assessment opportunity for teachers. The IF-AT uses a multiple-choice answer form with a thin opaque film covering the answer options. Instead of using a pencil to fill in a circle, each student scratches off their answer as if scratching a lottery ticket. The student scratches off the coating of the rectangle corresponding with their first-choice answer. If the answer is correct, a star or other symbol appears somewhere within the rectangle indicating he/she found the correct answer. The student's learning is immediately reinforced, the student receives full credit for the answer, and moves on to the next question. If incorrect, the student must re-read the question and remaining answer options and scratch off a second or even third choice until the correct answer is identified. The student will earn partial credit for multiple attempts and learn the correct response for each question while taking the test. One of the keys to the IF-AT system is that students never leave a question without knowing the correct answer.

== See also ==
- Learning analytics
- Reinforcement learning
- Performance appraisal
