= Language module =

Hypothesized brain structure for innate language capabilities

The language module or language faculty is a hypothetical structure in the human brain which is thought to contain innate capacities for language, originally posited by Noam Chomsky. There is ongoing research into brain modularity in the fields of cognitive science and neuroscience, although the current idea is much weaker than what was proposed by Chomsky and Jerry Fodor in the 1980s. In today's terminology, 'modularity' refers to specialisation: language processing is specialised in the brain to the extent that it occurs partially in different areas than other types of information processing such as visual input. The current view is, then, that language is neither compartmentalised nor based on general principles of processing (as proposed by George Lakoff). It is modular to the extent that it constitutes a specific cognitive skill or area in cognition.

== Meaning of a module ==
The notion of a dedicated language module in the human brain originated with Noam Chomsky's theory of Universal Grammar (UG). The debate on the issue of modularity in language is underpinned, in part, by different understandings of this concept. There is, however, some consensus in the literature that a module is considered committed to processing specialized representations (domain-specificity) in an informationally encapsulated way. A distinction should be drawn between anatomical modularity, which proposes there is one 'area' in the brain that deals with this processing, and functional modularity that obviates anatomical modularity whilst maintaining information encapsulation in distributed parts of the brain.

== No singular anatomical module ==
The available evidence points toward the conclusion that no single area of the brain is solely devoted to processing language. The Wada test, where sodium amobarbital is used to anaesthetise one hemisphere, shows that the left-hemisphere appears to be crucial in language processing. Yet, neuroimaging does not implicate any single area but rather identifies many different areas as being involved in different aspects of language processing. and not just in the left hemisphere. Further, individual areas appear to subserve a number of different functions. Thus, the extent to which language processing occurs within an anatomical module is considered to be minimal. Nevertheless, as many have suggested, modular processing can still exist even when implemented across the brain; that is, language processing could occur within a functional module.

== No double dissociation – acquired or developmental ==
A common way to demonstrate modularity is to find a double dissociation. That is two groups: First, people for whom language is severely damaged and yet have normal cognitive abilities and, second, persons for whom normal cognitive abilities are grossly impaired and yet language remains intact. Whilst extensive lesions in the left hemisphere perisylvian area can render persons unable to produce or perceive language (global aphasia), there is no known acquired case where language is completely intact in the face of severe non-linguistic deterioration. Thus, functional module status cannot be granted to language processing based on this evidence.

However, other evidence from developmental studies has been presented (most famously by Pinker) as supporting a language module, namely the purported dissociation between Specific Language Impairment (SLI), where language is disrupted whilst other mental abilities are not, and Williams Syndrome (WS) where language is said to be spared despite severe mental deficits. More recent and empirically robust work has shown that these claims may be inaccurate, thus, considerably weakening support for dissociation. For example, work reviewed by Brock and Mervis and Beccera demonstrated that language abilities in WS are no more than would be predicted by non-linguistic abilities. Further, there is considerable debate concerning whether SLI is actually a language disorder or whether its aetiology is due to a more general cognitive (e.g. phonological) problem. Thus, the evidence needed to complete the picture for modularity – intact language coupled with gross intellectual deterioration – is not forthcoming. Consequently, developmental data offers little support for the notion that language processing occurs within a module.

Thus, the evidence from double dissociations does not support modularity, although lack of dissociation is not evidence against a module; this inference cannot be logically made.

== Lack of information encapsulation ==
Indeed, if language were a module it would be informationally encapsulated. Yet, there is evidence to suggest that this is not the case. For instance, in the McGurk effect, watching lips say one phoneme whilst another is played creates the percept of a blended phoneme. Further, Tanenhaus, Spivey-Knowlton, Eberhard and Sedivy (1995) demonstrated visual information mediating syntactic processing. In addition, the putative language module should process only that information relevant to language (i.e., be domain-specific). Yet evidence suggests that areas purported to subserve language also mediate motor control and non-linguistic sound comprehension. Although it is possible that separate processes could be occurring but below the resolution of current imaging techniques, when all this evidence is taken together the case for information encapsulation is weakened.

== Alternative views ==
The alternative, as it is framed, is that language occurs within a more general cognitive system. The counterargument is that there appears to be something ‘special’ about human language. This is usually supported by evidence such as all attempts to teach animals human languages to any great success have failed (Hauser et al. 2003) and that language can be selectively damaged (a single dissociation) suggesting proprietary computation may be required. Instead of postulating 'pure' modularity, theorists have opted for a weaker version, domain-specificity implemented in functionally specialised neural circuits and computation (e.g. Jackendoff and Pinker's words, we must investigate language "not as a monolith but as a combination of components, some special to language, others rooted in more general capacities").

== See also ==
- Language center
- Motor theory of speech perception
- Noam Chomsky
