= Domain specificity =

Theoretical position related to cognitive science

Domain specificity is a theoretical position in cognitive science (especially modern cognitive development) that argues that many aspects of cognition are supported by specialized, presumably evolutionarily specified, learning devices. The position is a close relative of modularity of mind, but is considered more general in that it does not necessarily entail all the assumptions of Fodorian modularity (e.g., informational encapsulation). Instead, it is properly described as a variant of psychological nativism. Other cognitive scientists also hold the mind to be modular, without the modules necessarily possessing the characteristics of Fodorian modularity.

Domain specificity emerged in the aftermath of the cognitive revolution as a theoretical alternative to empiricist theories that believed all learning can be driven by the operation of a few such general learning devices. Prominent examples of such domain-general views include Jean Piaget's theory of cognitive development, and the views of many modern connectionists. Proponents of domain specificity argue that domain-general learning mechanisms are unable to overcome the epistemological problems facing learners in many domains, especially language. In addition, domain-specific accounts draw support from the surprising competencies of infants, who are able to reason about things like numerosity, goal-directed behavior, and the physical properties of objects all in the first months of life. Domain-specific theorists argue that these competencies are too sophisticated to have been learned via a domain-general process like associative learning, especially over such a short time and in the face of the infant's perceptual, attentional, and motor deficits. Current proponents of domain specificity argue that evolution equipped humans (and indeed most other species) with specific adaptations designed to overcome persistent problems in the environment. For humans, popular candidates include reasoning about objects, other intentional agents, language, and number. Researchers in this field seek evidence for domain specificity in a variety of ways. Some look for unique cognitive signatures thought to characterize a domain (e.g. differences in ways infants reason about inanimate versus animate entities). Others try to show selective impairment or competence within but not across domains (e.g. the increased ease of solving the Wason Selection Task when the content is social in nature). Still, others use learnability arguments to argue that a cognitive process or specific cognitive content could not be learned, as in Noam Chomsky's poverty of the stimulus argument for language.

Prominent proponents of domain specificity include Jerry Fodor, Noam Chomsky, Steven Pinker, Elizabeth Spelke, Susan Carey, Lawrence A. Hirschfeld, Susan Gelman and many others.

== See also ==
- Connectionism
- Domain-specificity vs. domain-generality in evolutionary developmental psychology
- Empiricism
- Modularity of mind
- Nature versus nurture
- Neural processing for individual categories of objects
- Psychological nativism
- Psychology of reasoning
