= Psychological nativism =

View in psychology about the brain

In the field of psychology, nativism is the view that certain skills or abilities are "native" or hard-wired into the brain at birth. This is in contrast to the "blank slate" or tabula rasa view, which states that the brain has inborn capabilities for learning from the environment but does not contain content such as innate beliefs. This factor contributes to the ongoing nature versus nurture dispute, one borne from the current difficulty of reverse engineering the subconscious operations of the brain, especially the human brain.

Some nativists believe that specific beliefs or preferences are "hard-wired". For example, one might argue that some moral intuitions are innate or that color preferences are innate. A less established argument is that nature supplies the human mind with specialized learning devices. This latter view differs from empiricism only to the extent that the algorithms that translate experience into information may be more complex and specialized in nativist theories than in empiricist theories. However, empiricists largely remain open to the nature of learning algorithms and are by no means restricted to the historical associationist mechanisms of behaviorism.

== In philosophy ==
Nativism has a history in philosophy, particularly as a reaction to the straightforward empiricist views of John Locke and David Hume. Hume had given persuasive logical arguments that people cannot infer causality from perceptual input. The most one could hope to infer is that two events happen in succession or simultaneously. One response to this argument involves positing that concepts not supplied by experience, such as causality, must exist prior to any experience and hence must be innate.

The philosopher Immanuel Kant (1724–1804) argued in his Critique of Pure Reason that the human mind knows objects in innate, a priori ways. Kant claimed that humans, from birth, must experience all objects as being successive (time) and juxtaposed (space). His list of inborn categories describes predicates that the mind can attribute to any object in general. Arthur Schopenhauer (1788–1860) agreed with Kant, but reduced the number of innate categories to one—causality—which presupposes the others.

== Modularity ==
Modern nativism is most associated with the work of Jerry Fodor (1935–2017), Noam Chomsky (b. 1928), and Steven Pinker (b. 1954), who argue that humans from birth have certain cognitive modules (specialized genetically inherited psychological abilities) that allow them to learn and acquire certain skills, such as language. For example, children demonstrate a facility for acquiring spoken language but require intensive training to learn to read and write. This poverty of the stimulus observation became a principal component of Chomsky's argument for a "language organ"—a genetically inherited neurological module that confers a somewhat universal understanding of syntax that all neurologically healthy humans are born with, which is fine-tuned by an individual's experience with their native language. In The Blank Slate (2002), Pinker similarly cites the linguistic capabilities of children, relative to the amount of direct instruction they receive, as evidence that humans have an inborn facility for speech acquisition (but not for literacy acquisition).

A number of other theorists have disagreed with these claims. Instead, they have outlined alternative theories of how modularization might emerge over the course of development, as a result of a system gradually refining and fine-tuning its responses to environmental stimuli.

=== Language ===
Research on the human capacity for language aims to provide support for a nativist view. Language is a species characteristic of humans: No human society has ever been discovered that does not employ a language, and all medically able children acquire at least one language in early childhood. The typical five-year-old can already use most, if not all, of the grammatical structures that are found in the language of the surrounding community. Yet, the knowledge of grammar is tacit: Neither the five-year-old nor the adults in the community can easily articulate the principles of the grammar they are following. Experimental evidence shows that infants come equipped with presuppositions that allow them to acquire the rules of their language.

The term universal grammar (or UG) is used for the purported innate biological properties of the human brain, whatever exactly they turn out to be, that are responsible for children's successful acquisition of a native language during the first few years of life. The person most strongly associated with the hypothesizing of UG is Noam Chomsky, although the idea of Universal Grammar has clear historical antecedents at least as far back as the 1300s, in the form of the Speculative Grammar of Thomas of Erfurt.

In generative grammar the principles and parameters (P&P) framework was the dominant formulation of UG before Chomsky's current Minimalist Program. In the P&P framework, a principle is a grammatical requirement that is meant to apply to all languages, and a parameter is a tightly constrained point of variation. In the early 1980s, parameters were often conceptualized as switches in a switch box (an idea attributed to James Higginbotham). In more recent research on syntax, parameters are often conceptualized as options for the formal features of functional heads.

The hypothesis that UG plays an essential role in normal child language acquisition arises from species differences: for example, children and household pets may be exposed to quite similar linguistic input, but by the age of three years, the child's ability to comprehend multi-word utterances vastly outstrips that of the dog or cat. This evidence is all the more impressive when one considers that most children do not receive reliable corrections for grammatical errors. Indeed, even children who for medical reasons cannot produce speech, and therefore have no possibility of producing an error in the first place, have been found to master both the lexicon and the grammar of their community's language perfectly. The fact that children succeed at language acquisition even when their linguistic input is severely impoverished, as it is when no corrective feedback is available, is related to the argument from the poverty of the stimulus, and is another claim for a central role of UG in child language acquisition.

== Relation to neuroscience ==
Neuroscientists working on the Blue Brain Project discovered that neurons transmit signals despite an individual's experience. It had been previously assumed that neuronal circuits are made when the experience of an individual is imprinted in the brain, making memories. Researchers at Blue Brain discovered a network of about fifty neurons which they believed were building blocks of more complex knowledge but contained basic innate knowledge that could be combined in different more complex ways to give way to acquired knowledge, like memory.

Scientists ran tests on the neuronal circuits of several rats and ascertained that if the neuronal circuits had only been formed based on an individual's experience, the tests would bring about very different characteristics for each rat. However, the rats all displayed similar characteristics which suggest that their neuronal circuits must have been established previously to their experiences. The Blue Brain Project research suggests that some of the "building blocks" of knowledge are genetic and present at birth.

== Criticism ==
Nativism is sometimes perceived as being too vague to be falsifiable, as there is no fixed definition of when an ability is supposed to be judged "innate". (As Jeffrey Elman and colleagues pointed out in Rethinking Innateness, it is unclear exactly how the supposedly innate information might actually be coded for in the genes.) Further, modern nativist theory makes little in the way of specific falsifiable and testable predictions, and has been compared by some empiricists to a pseudoscience or nefarious brand of "psychological creationism". As influential psychologist Henry L. Roediger III remarked that "Chomsky was and is a rationalist; he had no uses for experimental analyses or data of any sort that pertained to language, and even experimental psycholinguistics was and is of little interest to him".

Some researchers argue that the premises of linguistic nativism were motivated by outdated considerations and need reconsidering. For example, nativism was at least partially motivated by the perception that statistical inferences made from experience were insufficient to account for the complex languages humans develop. In part, this was a reaction to the failure of behaviorism and behaviorist models of the era to easily account for how something as complex and sophisticated as a full-blown language could ever be learned. Indeed, several nativist arguments were inspired by Chomsky's assertion that children could not learn complicated grammar based on the linguistic input they typically receive, and must therefore have an innate language-learning module, or language acquisition device. However, Chomsky's poverty of the stimulus argument is controversial within linguistics.

Many empiricists are now also trying to apply modern learning models and techniques to the question of language acquisition, with marked success. Similarity-based generalization marks another avenue of recent research, which suggests that children may be able to rapidly learn how to use new words by generalizing about the usage of similar words that they already know (see also the distributional hypothesis).

Paul Griffiths, in "What is Innateness?", argues that innateness is too confusing a concept to be fruitfully employed as it confuses "empirically dissociated" concepts. In a previous paper, Griffiths argued that innateness specifically confuses these three distinct biological concepts: developmental fixity, species nature, and intended outcome. Developmental fixity refers to how insensitive a trait is to environmental input, species nature reflects what it is to be an organism of a certain kind, and the intended outcome is how an organism is meant to develop.

== See also ==
- Domain specificity
- Evolutionary psychology
- Genetic memory (psychology)
- Hereditarianism
- Innateness hypothesis
- Neuroconstructivism
- Origin of language
- Origin of speech
- Psycholinguistics
