= Language acquisition device =

Theory that language learning is an instinctive mental capacity in infants

The Language Acquisition Device (LAD) is a claim from language acquisition research proposed by Noam Chomsky in the 1960s. The LAD concept is a purported instinctive mental capacity which enables an infant to acquire and produce language. It is a component of the nativist theory of language. This theory asserts that humans are born with the instinct or "innate facility" for acquiring language. The main argument given in favor of the LAD was the argument from the poverty of the stimulus, which argues that unless children have significant innate knowledge of grammar, they would not be able to learn language as quickly as they do, given that they never have access to negative evidence and rarely receive direct instruction in their first language.

Critics say there is insufficient evidence from neuroscience and language acquisition research to support the claim that people have a language acquisition device.

== See also ==
- Nicaraguan sign language

== Sources ==
- Briscoe, Ted (2000). "Grammatical Acquisition: Inductive Bias and Coevolution of Language and the Language Acquisition Device". Language. 76 (2): 245–296. doi:10.1353/lan.2000.0015. S2CID 146243305.
- Chomsky, Noam (1965). Aspects of the Theory of Syntax. MIT Press.
- Kennison, S. M. (2013). Introduction to language development. Los Angeles: Sage.
- VanPatten, Bill; Benati, Allesandro G. (2010). Key Terms in Second Language Acquisition. Continuum.
