= Poverty of the stimulus =

Linguistic argument for innate language-specific biases

A diagram of a hypothesis space, with datapoints marked with "x"s. Potential hypotheses are shown, and the correct hypothesis (D) is dashed.

In linguistics, the poverty of the stimulus is the claim that children are not exposed to rich enough data within their linguistic environments to acquire every feature of their language without innate language-specific cognitive biases. Arguments from the poverty of the stimulus are used as evidence for universal grammar, the notion that at least some aspects of linguistic competence are innate. The term "poverty of the stimulus" was coined by Noam Chomsky in Rules and Representations, 1980. A variety of linguistic phenomena have been used to argue for universal grammar on the basis that children do not have sufficient evidence to acquire the phenomena using general (i.e., non-language-specific) cognition alone. Critics of the universal grammar hypothesis have proposed alternative models that suggest acquisition of these phenomena may be less difficult than has been previously claimed. The empirical and conceptual bases of poverty of the stimulus arguments are a topic of continuing debate in linguistics.

== Background and history ==
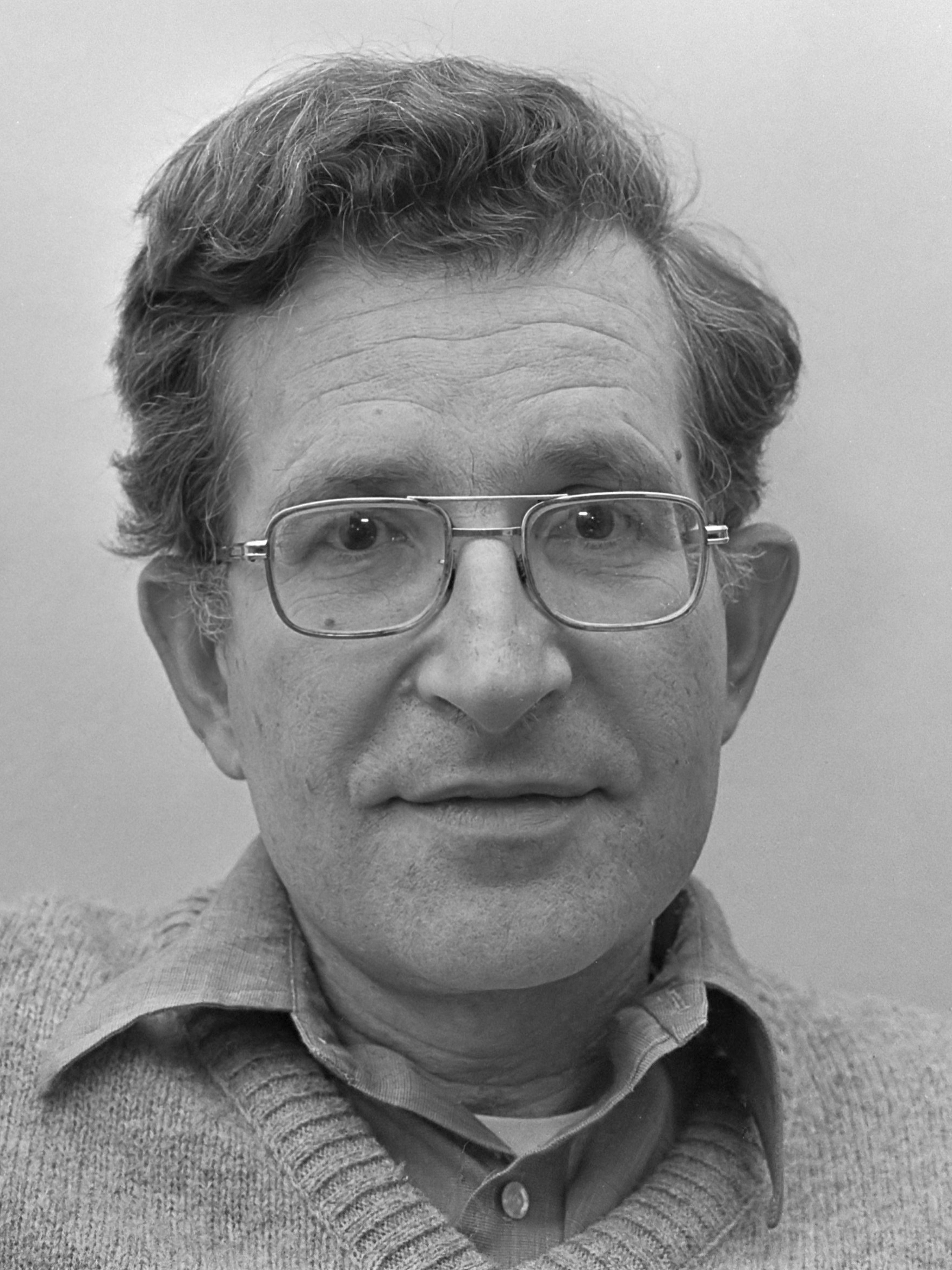
Noam Chomsky coined the term "poverty of the stimulus" in 1980.

Noam Chomsky coined the term "poverty of the stimulus" in 1980. This idea is closely related to what Chomsky calls "Plato's Problem". He outlined this philosophical approach in the first chapter of Knowledge of Language in 1986. Plato's Problem traces back to Meno, a Socratic dialogue. In Meno, Socrates unearths knowledge of geometry concepts from a slave who was never explicitly taught them. Plato's Problem directly parallels the idea of the innateness of language, universal grammar, and more specifically the poverty of the stimulus argument because it reveals that people's knowledge is richer than what they are exposed to. Chomsky suggests that humans are not exposed to all structures of their language, yet they fully achieve knowledge of these structures.

Linguistic nativism is the theory that humans are born with some knowledge of language (universal grammar), and that one acquires a language not entirely through experience. According to Noam Chomsky, "The speed and precision of vocabulary acquisition leaves no real alternative to the conclusion that the child somehow has the concepts available before experience with language and is basically learning labels for concepts that are already a part of his or her conceptual apparatus." For most generative grammarians, the poverty of the stimulus argument is a central tenet of the broader argument for linguistic nativism.

Pullum and Scholz frame the poverty of the stimulus argument by examining all of the ways that the input is insufficient for language acquisition. First, children are exposed only to positive evidence: they do not receive explicit correction or instruction about what is not possible in the language. Second, the input that children receive is degenerate in terms of scope and quality. Degeneracy of scope means that the input does not contain information about the full extent of any grammatical rules. Degeneracy of quality means that children are exposed to speech errors, utterances by nonnative speakers, and false starts, potentially obscuring the underlying grammatical structure of the language. Furthermore, the linguistic data each child is exposed to is different, meaning the basis for language learning is idiosyncratic even within a particular language. However, despite these insufficiencies, children eventually acquire the grammar of the language they are exposed to. Further, other organisms in the same environment do not. From a nativist point of view, the insufficiency of the input leads to the conclusion that humans are hard-wired with a universal grammar, supporting the innateness hypothesis.

However, the argument that the poverty of the stimulus supports the innateness hypothesis remains controversial. For example, Fiona Cowie claims that the Poverty of Stimulus argument fails "on both empirical and conceptual grounds to support nativism".

== Examples ==
The literature contains a variety of Poverty of the Stimulus arguments regarding a variety of phenomena.

=== Syntax ===
==== Binding theory – Principle C ====
1. While he was dancing, the Ninja Turtle ate pizza.
2. He ate pizza while the Ninja Turtle was dancing.

In general, pronouns can refer to any prominent individual in the discourse context. However, a pronoun cannot find its antecedent in certain structural positions, as defined by Binding Theory. For example, the pronoun "he" can refer to the Ninja Turtle in (1) but not (2), above. Given that speech to children does not indicate what interpretations are impossible, the input is equally consistent with a grammar that allows coreference between "he" and "the Ninja Turtle" in (2) and one that does not. But, since all speakers of English recognize that (2) does not allow this coreference, this aspect of the grammar must come from some property internal to the learner.

==== Passives ====
1. I believe the dog to be hungry
2. The dog is believed to be hungry
3. I believe the dog's owner to be hungry.
4. The dog's owner is believed to be hungry.
5. * The dog is believed's owner to be hungry.

The sentences in (1) and (2) illustrate the active-passive alternation in English. The Noun Phrase after the verb in the active (1) is the subject in the passive (2). Data like (2) would be compatible with a passive rule stated in terms of linear order (move the 1st NP after the verb) or syntactic structure (move the highest NP after the verb). The data in (3–5) illustrate that the actual rule is formulated in terms of structure. If it were stated in terms of linear order, then (4) would be ungrammatical and (5) would be grammatical. But the opposite is true. However, children may not be exposed to sentences like (3–5) as evidence in favor of the correct grammar. Thus, the fact that all adult speakers agree that (4) is grammatical and (5) is not suggests that the linear rule was never even considered and that children are predisposed to a structure based grammatical system.

==== Anaphoric "one" ====
The English word "one" can refer back to a previously mentioned property in the discourse. For example, in (1), "one" can mean "ball".

1. I like this ball and you like that one.
2. I like this red ball and you like that one.

In (2), "one" is interpreted as "red ball." However, even if a speaker intends (2) in this way, it would be difficult to distinguish that interpretation from one in which "one" simply meant "ball". This is because when a speaker refers to a red ball, they are also referring to a ball since the set of red balls is a subset of balls in general. 18-month-olds, like adults, show that they believe 'one' refers to 'red ball' and not 'ball'. The evidence available to children is systematically ambiguous between a grammar in which "one" refers back to Nouns and one in which "one" refers back to noun phrases. Despite this ambiguity, children learn the more narrow interpretation, suggesting that some property other than the input is responsible for their interpretations.

==== Island effects ====
In Wh-questions, the Wh-word at the beginning of the sentence (the filler) is related to a position later in the sentence (the gap). This relation can hold over an unbounded distance, as in (1). However, there are restrictions on the gap positions that a filler can be related to. These restrictions are called syntactic islands (2). Because questions with islands are ungrammatical, they are not included in the speech that children hear—but neither are grammatical Wh-questions that span multiple clauses. Because the speech children are exposed to is consistent with grammars that have island constraints and grammars that do not, something internal to the child must contribute this knowledge.

1. What did you claim that Jack bought _ ?
2. *What did you make the claim that Jack bought _ ? (Complex Noun Phrase Island)

=== Phonology ===
==== Learning stress systems ====
Bergelson & Idsardi (2009) presented adults with words drawn from an artificial language. The words contained 3 CV syllables. If the last vowel was long, then it bore stress. Otherwise, stress fell on the first syllable. This pattern is consistent with two grammars. In one grammar, a long vowel bears stress if it is the last segment in the word. This is a rule based on absolute finality. In the other grammar, a long vowel bears stress only if it is the last vowel in the word (i.e., even if it is not the last segment of the word). This is a rule based on relative finality. In natural languages stress rules make reference to relative finality but not to absolute finality. After being exposed to these words, participants were then tested to see whether they thought that a word with a long vowel in a closed syllable (CVVC) would bear stress. If it did, then that would be consistent with the relative-final grammar, but not with the absolute-final grammar. English-speaking adults (tested through computer software) were more likely to accept the words from the relative-final grammar than from the absolute-final grammar. Since the data they were exposed to was equally consistent with both grammars, and since neither rule is a rule of English, the source of this decision must have come from the participants, not from any aspect of their experience. In addition, eighth-month-old children (tested via the Headturn Preference Procedure) were found to have the same preference as adults. Given that this preference could not have come from their exposure to either the artificial language or to their native language, the researchers concluded that human language acquisition mechanisms are "hardwired" to lead infants towards certain generalizations, consistent with the argument for the poverty of the stimulus.

==== English plural marker ====
Halle (1978) argues that the morphophonological rule governing the English plural produces forms that are consistent with two grammars. In one grammar, the plural is pronounced as [s] if it follows one of the sounds [p, t, k, f, θ]; otherwise it is pronounced as [z]. In the other grammar, the plural is pronounced as [s] if it follows a voiceless consonant. These rules are exactly equal in their coverage of English since the set of consonants that triggers the [s] pronunciation is identical in the two cases. However, Halle also observes that English speakers consistently pluralize the German name Bach (pronounced /bax/) as /baxs/, despite not having any experience with the /x/ sound, which is nonexistent in English. Since there is "no indication" that speakers could have acquired this knowledge, Halle argues that the tendency to build rules in terms of natural classes comes from a factor internal to the child and not from their experience.

=== Semantics ===
==== Word learning ====
The poverty of the stimulus also applies in the domain of word learning. When learning a new word, children are exposed to examples of the word's referent, but not to the full extent of the category. For example, in learning the word "dog", a child might see a German Shepherd, a Great Dane and a Poodle. How do they know to extend this category to include Dachshunds and Bulldogs? The situations in which the word is used cannot provide the relevant information. Thus, something internal to learners must shape the way that they generalize. This problem is closely related to Quine's gavagai problem.

==== Attitude verbs ====
In other cases, words refer to aspects of the world that cannot be observed directly. For example Lila Gleitman poses a POS argument with respect to verbs that label mental states. She observes that a learner cannot see inside another person's mind, and so an utterance of "Kim thinks that it is raining" is likely to occur in the same kinds of contexts as "Kim wonders if it is raining" or even "Kim wants it to rain". If no aspect of the context can determine whether a mental state verb refers to thinkings, wanting or wonderings, then some aspect of children's minds must direct their attention to other cues. Thus, our ability to learn these word meanings must be shaped by factors internal to the child and not simply from the conditions of their use.

== Criticism ==
The empirical basis of poverty of the stimulus arguments has been challenged by Geoffrey Pullum and others, leading to back-and-forth debate in the language acquisition literature.

Recent work has also suggested that some recurrent neural network architectures are able to learn hierarchical structure without an explicit constraint. This raises the possibility that poverty of the stimulus arguments regarding hierarchical structure may have been mistaken.

== See also ==
- Empiricism
- Language acquisition
- Language module
- Psychological nativism
- Tabula rasa
- Universal grammar
