= Diagnosis of autism =

Clinical observation of autistic traits

Autism spectrum disorder (ASD) is diagnosed through observed and reported behavior; no biological or genetic markers currently allow for a definitive diagnosis. Clinicians base assessments on standardized behavioral criteria defined in the International Classification of Diseases (ICD) of the World Health Organization and the Diagnostic and Statistical Manual of Mental Disorders (DSM) of the American Psychiatric Association.

The DSM-5 (2013) unified earlier subtypes such as Asperger syndrome under a single autism spectrum diagnosis, while the DSM-5-TR (2022) maintained this framework with clarifying revisions. The ICD-10 (1994) has been superseded by the ICD-11 (2022), which aligns closely with DSM-5 definitions and is now being adopted internationally.

According to the DSM-5-TR, ASD is characterized by:

1. Persistent deficits in social communication and social interaction across contexts, and
2. Restricted, repetitive patterns of behavior, interests, or activities.

Symptoms must appear in early development, cause significant functional impairment, and not be better explained by intellectual disability or global developmental delay.

== Diagnostic challenges ==
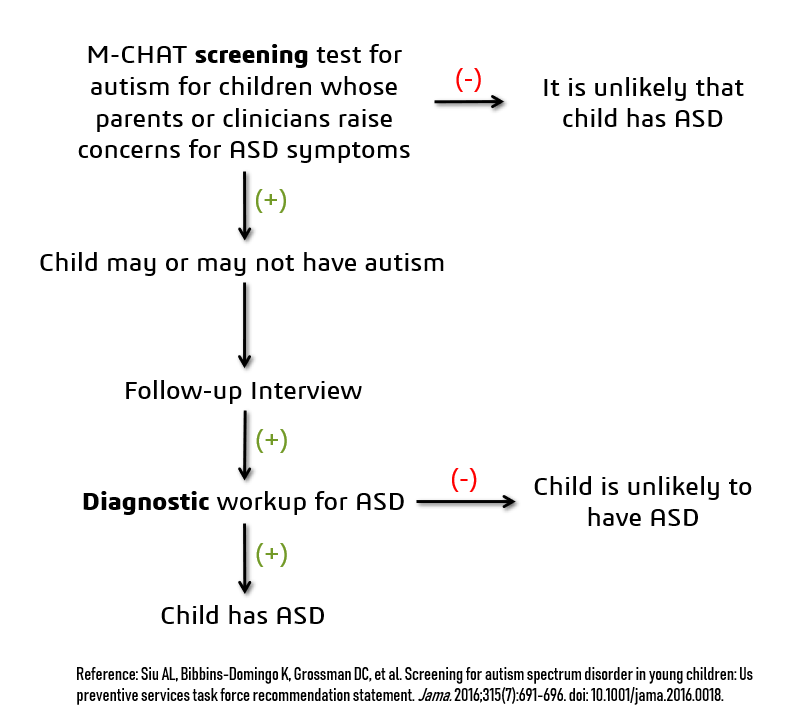
Process for screening and diagnosing ASD; M-CHAT is Modified Checklist for Autism in Toddlers; (+) is positive test result; (−) is negative test result.

Several factors make autism spectrum disorder (ASD) difficult to diagnose. There are no standardized imaging, molecular, or genetic tests that can confirm ASD. Moreover, ASD presents with wide individual variation. Its behavioral characteristics differ depending on developmental stage, age of presentation, gender, level of support, and personal variability. ASD can also resemble several other conditions, including intellectual disability, hearing impairment, a specific language impairment such as Landau–Kleffner syndrome, ADHD, anxiety disorder, and psychotic disorders. Furthermore, the presence of autism can make it harder to diagnose cooccurring psychiatric disorders such as depression. Diagnosing ASD in adults poses additional difficulties, as many undiagnosed individuals have developed masking techniques which make recognition of symptoms challenging. Adults, particularly those from marginalized communities, also face financial and social barriers to receiving a formal diagnosis.

== DSM-5-TR criteria ==
The DSM-5-TR lists five criteria (with examples) which include two groups of criteria (the first two):

- Persistent impairments in social communication and interaction, characterized by difficulties in social-emotional exchange, nonverbal communication, and forming or understanding relationships.
- Restricted, repetitive patterns of behavior, interests, or activities, as manifested by at least two of the following: repetitive actions or speech, strict adherence to routines, intense fixations, and unusual sensory responses.
- Symptoms must be evident early in development, though they may only become noticeable when social demands exceed abilities or may be masked by learned coping strategies later in life.
- Symptoms cause significant impairment in social, occupational, or other important areas of current functioning.
- The symptoms are not better explained by intellectual developmental disorder or global developmental delay.

People who do not meet the formal diagnostic criteria for autism spectrum disorder may be classified as falling under the broader autism phenotype. The broader autism phenotype is an informal classification that covers people who have some traits similar to autism, but who do not meet the diagnostic criteria for autism. It falls in between typical behaviors and autism itself.

== Diagnostic process ==
Ideally, the diagnosis of autism spectrum disorder (ASD) is made by a team of clinicians—such as pediatricians, medical specialists, psychologists, therapists and neurologists—based on information from the affected individual, caregivers, educators, other medical professionals, and direct observation.

The age at which ASD is diagnosed varies. Some children can be diagnosed as early as 18 months, although diagnoses before age two are less reliable. Diagnostic stability increases over the first three years of life; for example, a one-year-old who meets criteria is less likely than a three-year-old to do so later. More severe forms of ASD are usually identified earlier. Delays in appointment scheduling and the cost of care can also postpone diagnosis.

Screening usually begins with a pediatrician or primary care physician taking a developmental history and performing a physical examination. If concerns arise, the physician may refer the individual for assessment to an ASD specialist who evaluates cognitive, communication, and family factors using standardized tools while considering any associated medical conditions. A pediatric neuropsychologist may also assess behavior and cognitive abilities to support diagnosis and guide educational planning.

After diagnosis, additional testing may be performed. A clinical genetics evaluation is often recommended when symptoms suggest a genetic cause. Although up to 40% of ASD cases are linked to genetic factors, comprehensive genetic testing is not routinely recommended. Current U.S. and U.K. guidelines limit testing to high-resolution chromosome and fragile X analysis. Metabolic and neuroimaging tests are also not routinely used for diagnosis.

In the United Kingdom, the National Autism Plan for Children recommends that diagnosis be completed within 30 weeks of first concern, though few assessments meet this target. Increased awareness, broader diagnostic criteria, and improved access to care have contributed to more adults receiving ASD diagnoses. Diagnosing adults poses unique challenges because it relies on accurate developmental histories and may be complicated by coping strategies—known as "masking" or "camouflaging"—that conceal symptoms.

Presentation and diagnosis can also vary by sex and gender. Most studies have not clearly distinguished between biological and social factors. Evidence suggests that autistic girls and women tend to display fewer repetitive behaviors and more camouflaging than males, often by imitating typical facial expressions or eye contact. These differences, along with gender stereotypes, can delay or obscure diagnosis in females. As a result, many autistic women are diagnosed late, misdiagnosed, or remain undiagnosed.

Because ASD diagnosis relies on behavioral observation, several professional organizations have published practice parameters. The American Academy of Neurology released guidelines in 2000, followed by the American Academy of Child and Adolescent Psychiatry in 1999, and a multi-society consensus panel the same year. These recommend initial screening by general practitioners (Level 1) and a comprehensive evaluation by experienced clinicians (Level 2). They also emphasize a developmental framework, input from multiple informants such as parents and teachers, and a multidisciplinary team including clinical psychologists, neuropsychologists, and psychiatrists.

As of 2019, psychologists typically wait until a child exhibits early signs of ASD before administering standardized assessment tools. The Autism Diagnostic Interview-Revised (ADI-R) and Autism Diagnostic Observation Schedule (ADOS) are considered the gold-standard instruments for diagnosis. The ADI-R is a structured parent interview that explores current and past behavior, while the ADOS directly observes social and communication behaviors through interactive tasks. Other tools, such as the Childhood Autism Rating Scale, Autism Treatment Evaluation Checklist, and cognitive tests like the Peabody Picture Vocabulary Test, are often part of a full assessment battery. The Diagnostic Interview for Social and Communication Disorders (DISCO) may also be used.

== Screening ==
About half of parents of children with ASD notice their child's atypical behaviors by age 18 months, and about four-fifths notice by age 24 months. If a child does not meet any of the following milestones, it "is an absolute indication to proceed with further evaluations. Delay in referral for such testing may delay early diagnosis and treatment and affect the [child's] long-term outcome."

- No response to name (or gazing with direct eye contact) by 6 months.
- No babbling by 12 months.
- No gesturing (pointing, waving, etc.) by 12 months.
- No single words by 16 months.
- No two-word (spontaneous, not just echolalic) phrases by 24 months.
- Loss of any language or social skills, at any age.

The Japanese practice is to screen all children for ASD at 18 and 24 months, using autism-specific formal screening tests. In contrast, in the UK, children whose families or doctors recognize possible signs of autism are screened. It is not known which approach is more effective. The UK National Screening Committee does not recommend universal ASD screening in young children. Their main concerns includes higher chances of misdiagnosis at younger ages and lack of evidence of effectiveness of early interventions. There is no consensus between professional and expert bodies in the US on screening for autism in children younger than 3 years.

Screening tools include the Modified Checklist for Autism in Toddlers (M-CHAT), the Early Screening of Autistic Traits Questionnaire, and the First Year Inventory; initial data on M-CHAT and its predecessor, the Checklist for Autism in Toddlers (CHAT), on children aged 18–30 months suggests that it is best used in a clinical setting and that it has low sensitivity (many false-negatives) but good specificity (few false-positives). It may be more accurate to precede these tests with a broadband screener that does not distinguish ASD from other developmental disorders. Screening tools designed for one culture's norms for behaviors like eye contact may be inappropriate for a different culture. Although genetic screening for autism is generally still impractical, it can be considered in some cases, such as children with neurological symptoms and dysmorphic features.

== Diagnosis and assessment ==
Diagnosis of autism spectrum disorder (ASD) relies on behavioral assessment, as no biological or genetic marker can yet confirm the condition. Diagnostic tools are designed to standardize clinical observations and parent reports to ensure accuracy and consistency across evaluators. Most tools are used in conjunction with professional clinical judgment and multidisciplinary evaluation.

=== Core diagnostic assessments ===
==== Autism Diagnostic Observation Schedule (ADOS, ADOS-2) ====
The Autism Diagnostic Observation Schedule (ADOS), first developed by Catherine Lord and colleagues in 1989 and revised as ADOS-2 in 2012, is a semi-structured, play-based assessment that observes social communication and restricted behaviors.

- Structure: The ADOS-2 consists of five modules selected according to an individual's age and expressive language level.
- Administration: Conducted by a trained clinician in 30–60-minute sessions.
- Purpose: Measures spontaneous communication, social reciprocity, and use of imagination during structured activities.
- Scoring: Each behavior is coded and algorithm scores are compared to threshold values indicating the likelihood of ASD.

The ADOS-2 is considered a "gold-standard" observational measure and is used worldwide in both clinical and research contexts.

==== Autism Diagnostic Interview–Revised (ADI-R) ====
The Autism Diagnostic Interview–Revised (ADI-R) is a structured caregiver interview providing a developmental history of social behavior, communication, and restricted interests.

- Format: Conducted with a parent or primary caregiver and lasting 90–150 minutes.
- Domains: Early social development, communication milestones, play skills, and repetitive behaviors.
- Purpose: Captures information on an individual's lifetime development to supplement direct observation.
- Scoring: Responses are numerically coded and analyzed against diagnostic algorithms corresponding to DSM-5 and ICD-11 criteria.

The ADI-R complements the ADOS-2 by documenting early development that may not be observable in a clinical setting.

=== Supplementary and Screening Measures ===
Although the ADOS-2 and ADI-R remain the primary diagnostic tools, several other instruments assist in screening or assessing related domains.

==== Developmental and Behavioral Screeners ====
- Modified Checklist for Autism in Toddlers, Revised with Follow-Up (M-CHAT-R/F): A brief parent questionnaire for children aged 16–30 months, used for early detection of risk.
- Social Communication Questionnaire (SCQ): Adapted from the ADI-R for children aged four years and older to screen for social communication difficulties.
- Social Responsiveness Scale (SRS): A quantitative rating scale measuring severity of autism-related social impairment.

These screeners identify children who may benefit from a comprehensive diagnostic evaluation.

==== Cognitive and Adaptive Functioning Assessments ====
To contextualize ASD-specific findings, clinicians often include standardized assessments such as:

- Wechsler Intelligence Scales or other cognitive tests to evaluate intellectual ability.
- Vineland Adaptive Behavior Scales to assess daily living skills and social functioning.

These tools help distinguish autism from intellectual disability and guide individualized intervention planning.

=== Integration and Clinical Judgment ===
Clinical accuracy depends on integrating standardized instruments with professional expertise. Diagnosing clinicians synthesize behavioral observations, developmental history, and test results to determine whether the individual meets criteria for ASD. Research emphasizes the importance of ongoing professional training and multidisciplinary collaboration to ensure consistent application of diagnostic tools.

=== Emerging Tools and Technologies ===
Recent developments aim to improve access and reduce diagnostic delays:

- Tele-assessment adaptations of the ADOS-2 and ADI-R for remote use.
- Machine learning models analyzing behavioral videos for automated screening.
- Culturally adapted instruments designed to minimize diagnostic bias in diverse populations.
- A panel of twelve serum proteins as a blood biomarker for ASD in boys.

These innovations expand diagnostic accessibility while maintaining reliability standards.

== Prevalence of autism diagnosis rates ==
From 2011 to 2022, there was a 175% increase in autism diagnosis rates. According to the CDC, in 2023, 1 in 36 8-year olds were found to be diagnosed with ASD while in 2018, only 1 in 44 8-year olds were found to be diagnosed with ASD. Studies also show that boys are more likely to be diagnosed with ASD than girls despite there being no difference between the two in symptoms and overall expression.

== See also ==
- Autism-spectrum quotient
