= Roger Bakeman =

Developmental psychologist

- Occupation: Professor Emeritus
- Awards: Outstanding Faculty Scholarship Award, Georgia State University; Fellow, American Psychological Association

Academic background
- Education: University of Texas at Austin (Ph.D), Antioch College (B.A)

Academic work
- Discipline: Psychology
- Sub-discipline: Developmental
- Institutions: Georgia State University

Roger Bakeman is a quantitative (developmental) psychologist and Professor Emeritus at Georgia State University. Much of his work has focused on the development of observational research methods for analyzing interactive behavioral patterns, known as sequential analysis, and applications of these methods to infant social development, parent-child engagement, joint attention, and early communicative development.

Bakeman is an elected Fellow of the American Psychological Association, Division 7 (Developmental Psychology) and Division 44 (Society for the Psychology of Sexual Orientation and Gender Diversity).

== Biography ==
Bakeman received his B.A. degree in History at Antioch College in 1962 and spent the following year in Yale University’s East Asian Studies program. He later attended graduate school at the University of Texas at Austin, where he earned his Ph.D. in Psychology in 1973. Supervised by Robert Helmreich, his doctoral research examined individual and group behavioral patterns during Tektite II, a 1970 underwater research program that investigated human behavior in isolated environments. His dissertation, Groups, individuals, and time: Studies of behavioral patterns in Tektite 2, was completed in 1973. Before starting his academic career, Bakeman worked as a senior systems analyst at Leasco Systems and Research and as a senior senior research programmer at the Brookings Institution.

Bakeman joined Georgia State University faculty as an Assistant Professor of Psychology in 1973. He was later promoted to Associate Professor in 1978, and to Full Professor in 1984. He received Georgia State University’s College of Arts and Sciences Outstanding Faculty Scholarship Award in 1999. Bakeman remained at Georgia State until his retirement in 2007. Throughout his career at Georgia State, Bakeman collaborated with Lauren Adamson on studies of infant communication and joint attention funded by the National Science Foundation and the National Institutes of Health.

Bakeman served as Associate Editor of Child Development, Infancy, and Behavior Research Methods, and the International Conference of Infant Studies.

== Research ==
Bakeman collaborated with Lauren Adamson on studies of mother-infant interaction, early communication, and the development of joint attention. Their research explored how infants coordinate attention between people and objects and how these interactions change throughout early development and included innovative methods of data analysis for observational research. He worked closely with Adamson in observing how infants and toddlers interact and communicate with their mothers and how joint attention is reshaped as children acquire language. Several of their studies focused specifically on children with autism and Down syndrome. Bakeman and his co-authors received an Editor’s Award from the Journal of Speech, Language, and Hearing Research for their 2010 article entitled Randomized comparison of augmented and nonaugmented language interventions for toddlers with delays and their parents.

Bakeman authored statistics textbooks for students and researchers at varying levels of expertise. Spreadsheet exercises were central to Bakeman's approach in Understanding Social Science Statistics: A Spreadsheet Approach. This book encouraged students to apply statistical concepts as they learned them, with lesser emphasis on the theoretical assumptions underlying the tests.

Bakeman and his colleagues developed advancing quantitative methods for sequential analysis, with the aim of understanding how the order of behaviors reveals patterns in social interaction, and how individual actions relate to one another over time. His book Observing Interaction: An Introduction to Sequential Analysis, written in collaboration with John Gottman, provided an analytic framework for examining sequences of behavior that occur what people interact and the probabilities of specific behaviors following others, using examples of spoken interactions and conversational turns. In other work, Bakeman and his collaborators studied agreement between observers, comparing two ways of scoring observations of behavior over time, one based on time intervals and the other on individual events. Working with Vicenç Quera, Bakeman further developed analytical approaches for sequential analysis including software to analyze observational data.

== Representative publications ==
- Bakeman, R., & Dabbs, J. M., Jr. (1976). Social interaction observed: Some approaches to the analysis of behavior streams. Personality and Social Psychology Bulletin, 335-345. https://doi.org/10.1177/014616727600200403
- Bakeman, R. & Adamson, L. B. (1984). Coordinating attention to people and objects in mother-infant and peer-infant interaction. Child Development, 1278-1289. https://doi.org/10.2307/1129997
- Bakeman, R., Adamson, L. B., Konner, M., & Barr, R. G. (1990). !Kung infancy: The social context of object exploration. Child Development, 61(3), 794-809. https://doi.org/10.1111/j.1467-8624.1990.tb02822.x
- Bakeman, R. (2005). Recommended effect size statistics for repeated measures designs. Behavior Research Methods, 37(3), 379-384. https://doi.org/10.3758/BF03192707
- Bakeman, R., Quera, V., & Gnisci A. (2009). Observer agreement for timed-event sequential data: A comparison of time-based and event-based algorithms. Behavior Research Methods, 41, 137–147. https://doi.org/10.3758/BRM.41.1.137

== Books ==
- Bakeman, Roger (1992). Understanding social science statistics: a spreadsheet approach. Erlbaum. ISBN 978-0-8058-0623-6.
- Bakeman, R., & Gottman, J. M. (1997). Observing interaction: An introduction to sequential analysis (2nd ed.). Cambridge University Press. https://doi.org/10.1017/CBO9780511527685
- Bakeman, R., & Robinson, B. F. (1994). Understanding log-linear analysis with ILOG: An interactive approach. Erlbaum. https://doi.org/10.4324/9780203763216
- Bakeman, R., & Robinson, B.F. (2005). Understanding statistics in the behavioral sciences. Erlbaum. https://doi.org/10.4324/9781410612625
- Bakeman, R., & Quera, V. (2011). Sequential analysis and observational methods for the behavioral sciences. Cambridge University Press. https://doi.org/10.1017/CBO9781139017343
