= Lauren Adamson =

American developmental psychologist (1948–2021)

- Born: June 21, 1948; Saranac Lake, New York, US
- Died: December 31, 2021 (aged 73); New York, US
- Occupation: Regents' Professor Emerita of Psychology
- Spouse: Walter L. Adamson

Academic background
- Education: Swarthmore College (BA); University of California, Berkeley (MA, PhD)

Academic work
- Discipline: Psychologist
- Sub-discipline: Developmental psychology
- Institutions: Georgia State University

Lauren Bernstein Adamson (June 21, 1948 – December 31, 2021) was an American developmental psychologist known for her research on communicative development, parent-child interaction, and joint attention in infants with typical and atypical developmental trajectories. She was a Regents' Professor Emerita of Psychology at Georgia State University.

Adamson was a Fellow of the American Psychological Association (Division 7, Developmental Psychology) and also a Fellow of the Association for Psychological Science. She was the author of the book Communication Development During Infancy and co-editor of Communication and Language Acquisition: Discoveries from Atypical Development (with Mary Ann Romski).

== Early life and education ==
Lauren Bernstein was born in Saranac Lake, New York, and grew up in Milford, Connecticut.

Adamson received her B.A. in Psychology, with minors in Biology and Sociology, from Swarthmore College in 1970. At Swarthmore studied with Hans Wallach. She then attended the University of California, Berkeley where she completed her M.A. in Psychology in 1972 and her Ph.D. in Psychology in 1977. Early in her career as a Research Scientist at Children's Medical Center, Boston, she gained experience in infancy research working with Edward Tronick, Heidelise Als, and T. Berry Brazelton. This research team developed the still face paradigm, a widely used assessment of young infants' reactions to the sudden unresponsiveness of an adult during face-to-face interaction.

Adamson joined the Faculty of Psychology at Georgia State University in 1980 where she remained until her retirement in 2015. She served as Dean of its College of Arts and Sciences from 2003 to 2011. Her work has been funded by numerous grants from the National Institute of Child Health and Human Development, National Institute of Deafness and Other Communication Disorders, National Science Foundation, Institute of Education Sciences, U.S. Department of Education, and Autism Speaks.

== Personal life ==
She was married to Walter L. Adamson, the Samuel Candler Dobbs Professor of History at Emory University.

== Research ==
Adamson's research program focused on the development of engagement of infants and young children with their social partners. She conducted collaborative research with Roger Bakeman and others in which they monitored the behaviors of infants during social engagements with their caregivers and peers to track the development of joint attention skills. Their studies focused on shared attention to objects, displays of emotion, and occurrence of gestures and words. In all instances, infants exhibited more complex forms of social engagement with their mothers than with peers at young ages, underscoring the role of caregivers in scaffolding (supporting) infants' attention to objects and people. Adamson and her colleagues extended this line of research by monitoring joint engagement in populations with atypical development. Their aim was to see how variation in patterns of joint engagement might impact language developmental trajectories of children with ASD and Down syndrome.

Adamson and her colleagues also conducted intervention studies to support children's language development. One of their co-authored articles "Randomized Comparison of Augmented and Nonaugmented Language Interventions for Toddlers With Developmental Delays and Their Parents" received the ASHA Editor's Award for best paper published in 2010 in the Journal of Speech, Language, and Hearing Research. The research concluded that augmented communication was more beneficial in supporting vocabulary development in children with developmental delays than interventions that used only spoken communication.

== Representative publications ==
- Adamson, L. B., Bakeman, R., & Deckner, D. F. (2004). The development of symbol‐infused joint engagement. Child Development, 75(4), 1171–1187.
- Adamson, L. B., Bakeman, R., Deckner, D. F., & Romski, M. (2009). Joint engagement and the emergence of language in children with autism and Down syndrome. Journal of Autism and Developmental Disorders, 39(1), 84–96.
- Adamson, L. B., & Frick, J. E. (2003). The still face: A history of a shared experimental paradigm. Infancy, 4(4), 451–473.
- Bakeman, R., & Adamson, L. B. (1984). Coordinating attention to people and objects in mother-infant and peer-infant interaction. Child Development, 55(4), 1278–1289.
- Barr, R. G., Konner, M., Bakeman, R., & Adamson, L. (1991). Crying in! Kung San infants: A test of the cultural specificity hypothesis. Developmental Medicine & Child Neurology, 33(7), 601–610.
- Tronick, E., Als, H., Adamson, L., Wise, S., & Brazelton, T. B. (1978). The infant's response to entrapment between contradictory messages in face-to-face interaction. Journal of the American Academy of Child Psychiatry, 17(1), 1–13.
