= ATEC =

ATEC may refer to:

- Atec, an aerospace and energy component manufacturer
- ATEC v.o.s., a Czech aircraft manufacturer
- Autism Treatment Evaluation Checklist, a psychological assessment tool
- United States Army Test and Evaluation Command
- Inland Railway a.k.a. Australian Transport and Energy Corridor
