= Lisa M. Oakes =

American infant psychologist

Lisa M. Oakes is an American psychologist and professor who has made major contributions to understanding infant cognitive development. She wrote an influential book, Developmental Cascades: Building the Infant Mind(with David Rakison), which promotes a cascades approach to conceptualizing development. She also wrote a textbook on infant psychological development, Infancy: The development of the whole child (with Vanessa LoBue and Marianella Casasola). From 2018 to 2020, she was the President of the International Congress on Infant Studies (ICIS), the major professional society for research on infant psychological development, and she is currently Editor-in-Chief of the society's journal, Infancy.

== Biography ==
In 1985, Oakes received a B.A. in psychology from the University of California, San Diego, where she worked with Elizabeth Bates and Jeffrey O. Miller In 1991, she received a Ph.D. in psychology from the University of Texas at Austin, where she worked with Leslie B. Cohen. She then took a faculty position in the Department of Psychology at the University of Iowa, where she was promoted to associate professor in 1997 and Professor in 2004. In 2006, she moved to the Department of Psychology and the Center for Mind & Brain at the University of California, Davis, where she is currently a Distinguished Professor.

Oakes is the eldest child of education scholar Jeannie Oakes.

== Research contributions ==
Oakes's research has focused on how infants come to understand the world. She has focused on how they learn to perceive causality and categorize objects how their ability to direct attention becomes more sophisticated over development, and how they develop the ability to store and use information in working memory. Her general theoretical view is that development is a set of cascading interactions between the environment and the infant, in which the infant's developing psychological and physical abilities impact the input they receive from the environment (e.g., the ability to sit changes the visual input), and the environmental inputs then impact further development. As Editor-in-Chief of Infancy, she has stressed the importance of conducting research with infants from a broad range of societies and cultures across the globe

She has argued that it is not useful to study the development of individual cognitive processes in isolation with the hope that the resulting theories can later be integrated; this leads to what she called the “Humpty Dumpty problem,” in which the pieces corresponding to the individual processes cannot easily be put back together again. She has also been a leader in developing and using eye tracking methods in infancy and has promoted best practices for quantifying and optimizing statistical power in infant research.

== Awards and honors ==
Oakes is a fellow of the Association for Psychological Science and Divisions 3 and 7 of the American Psychological Association She won the Eleanor Maccoby Book Award in Developmental Psychology in 2022 for Developmental Cascades: Building the Infant Mind (with David Rakison). She has also won several teaching awards from the University of California, Davis, including the Graduate Program Advising and Mentoring Award in 2023, the Chancellor's Award for Excellence in Mentoring Undergraduate Research in 2024, and the Distinguished Teaching Award for Undergraduate Teaching in 2025.

== Representative publications ==
- Oakes, L. M., & Cohen, L. B. (1990). Infant perception of a causal event. Cognitive Development, 5, 193–207. Infant perception of a causal event
- Madole, K. L., & Oakes, L. M. (1999). Making sense of infant categorization: Stable processes and changing representations. Developmental Review, 19, 263–296. Making Sense of Infant Categorization: Stable Processes and Changing Representations
- Ross-Sheehy, S., Oakes, L. M., & Luck, S. J. (2003). The development of visual short-term memory capacity in infants. Child Development, 74, 1807–1822. The Development of Visual Short-Term Memory Capacity in Infants
- Pomaranski, K. I., Hayes, T. R., Kwon, M.-K., Henderson, J. M., & Oakes, L. M. (2021). Developmental changes in natural scene viewing in infancy. Developmental Psychology, 57,1025–1041. Developmental changes in natural scene viewing in infancy.
