= Tronick =

Tronick is a surname. Notable people with the surname include:

- Edward Tronick, American developmental psychologist
- Michael Tronick (born 1949), American film editor
