= Joint attention =

When two people focus on something at once

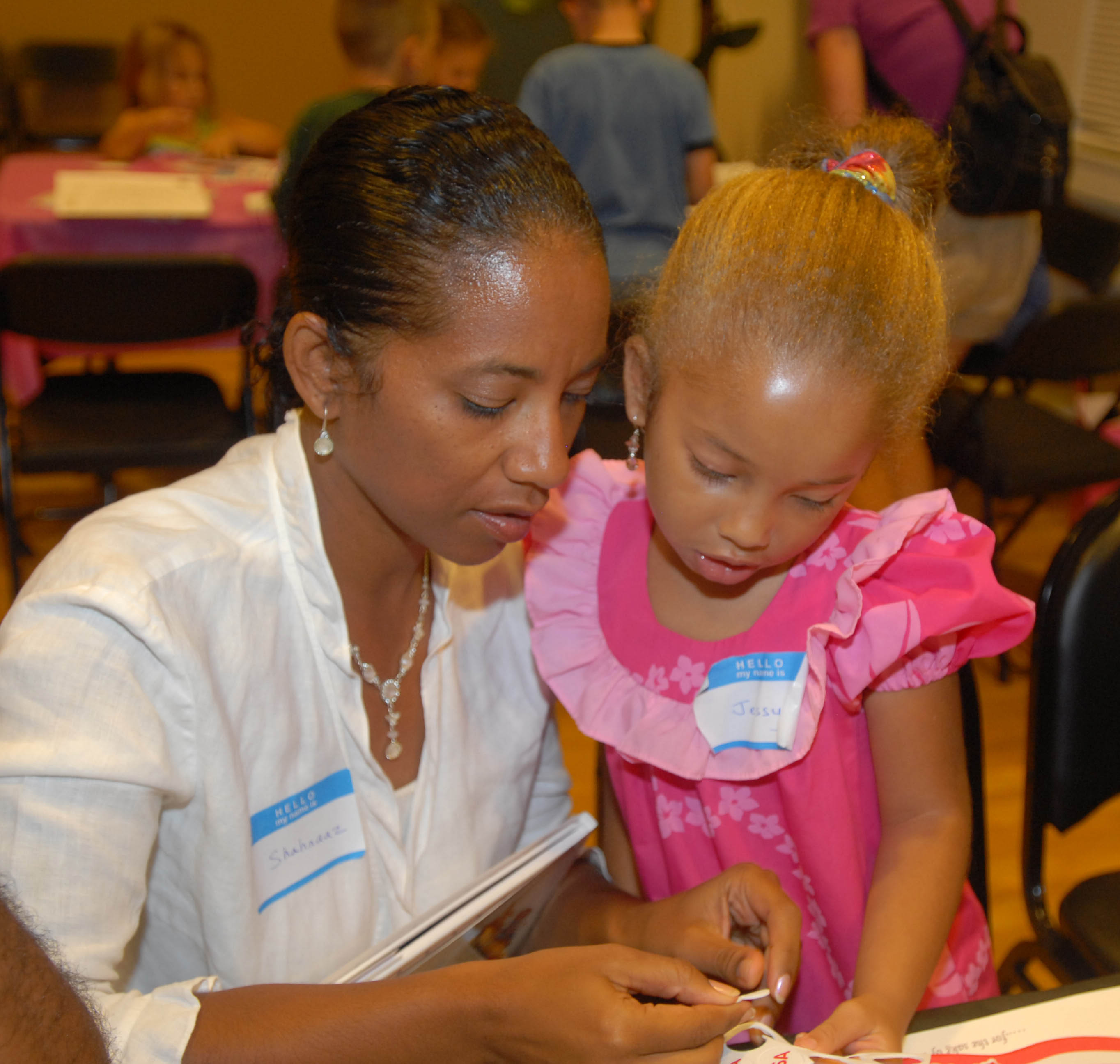
A mother and her daughter engaged in joint attention

Joint attention or shared attention is the shared focus of two individuals on an object. It is achieved when one individual alerts another to an object by means of eye-gazing, pointing or other verbal or non-verbal indications. An individual gazes at another individual, points to an object and then returns their gaze to the individual. Scaife and Bruner were the first researchers to present a cross-sectional description of children's ability to follow eye gaze in 1975. They found that most eight- to ten-month-old children followed a line of regard, and that all 11- to 14-month-old children did so. This early research showed it was possible for an adult to bring certain objects in the environment to an infant's attention using eye gaze.

Subsequent research demonstrates that two important skills in joint attention are following eye gaze and identifying intention. The ability to share gaze with another individual is an important skill in establishing reference. The ability to identify intention is important in a child's ability to learn language and direct the attention of others. Joint attention is important for many aspects of language development including comprehension, production and word learning. Episodes of joint attention provide children with information about their environment, allowing individuals to establish reference from spoken language and learn words. Socio-emotional development and the ability to take part in normal relationships are also influenced by joint attention abilities. The ability to establish joint attention may be negatively affected by deafness, blindness, and developmental disorders such as autism.

Other animals such as great apes, dogs, and horses also show some elements of joint attention.

== Humans ==
=== Levels of joint attention ===
Defining levels of joint attention is important in determining if children are engaging in age-appropriate joint attention. There are three levels of joint attention: triadic, dyadic, and shared gaze.

Triadic joint attention is the highest level of joint attention and involves two individuals looking at an object. Each individual must understand that the other individual is looking at the same object and realize that there is an element of shared attention. For an instance of social engagement to count as triadic joint attention it requires at least two individuals attending to an object or focusing their attention on each other. Additionally, the individual must display awareness that focus is shared between himself or herself and another individual. Triadic attention is marked by the individual looking back to the other individual after looking at the object.

Dyadic joint attention is a conversation-like behavior that individuals engage in. This is especially true for human adults and infants, who engage in this behavior starting at two months of age. Adults and infants take turns exchanging facial expressions, noises, and in the case of the adult, speech. Sensitivity to dyadic orientation plays a major role in the development of dyadic attention. Infants must be able to correctly orient towards in response to the attention seeking interaction.

Shared gaze occurs when two individuals are simply looking at an object. Shared gaze is the lowest level of joint attention. Evidence has demonstrated the adaptive value of shared gaze; it allows quicker completion of various group effort related tasks It is likely an important evolved trait allowing for individuals to communicate in simple and directed manner. It has been argued that shared gaze is one of the main precursors to theory of mind.

Individuals who engage in triadic joint attention must understand both gaze and intention to establish common reference. Gaze refers to a child's understanding of the link between mental activity and the physical act of seeing. Intention refers to the child's ability to understand the goal of another person's mental processes.

=== Gaze ===
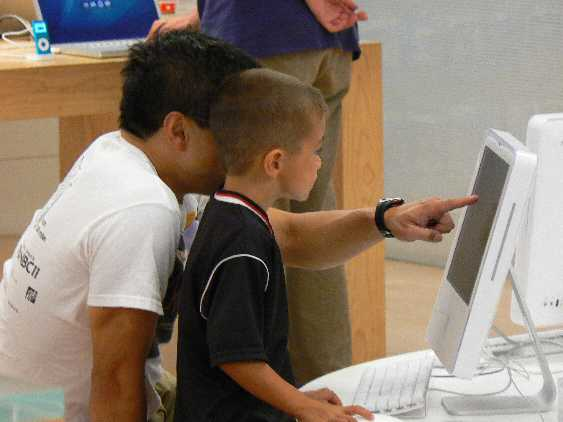
A parent and child engage in joint attention through pointing.

For an individual to engage in joint attention they must establish reference. Following the gaze or directive actions (such as pointing) of others is a common way of establishing reference. For an individual to understand that following gaze establishes reference the individual must display:

- Recognition that looking is intentional behavior directed to external objects and events. Following gaze serves the purpose of establishing reference.
- An understanding that looking results in the mental experience of seeing an object or event.
- Recognition that eyes are responsible for seeing.
- Recognition that others share in the capacity to see things.
- An understanding that voice direction helps determine whether the speaker is talking to them and what he or she is referring to or focused on.

Gaze becomes more complex with age and practice. As gaze increases in complexity, individuals are better able to discriminate what others are referring to. Joint attention is also important for social learning. Gaze following reflects an expectation-based type of orienting in which an individual's attention is cued by another's head turn or eye turn. Individuals are motivated to follow another's gaze and engage in joint attention because gaze is a cue for which rewarding events occur.

=== Intention ===
The ability to identify intention is critical to joint attention. When individuals understand that others have goals, intentions, and attentional states, they are able to enter into and direct another's attention. Joint attention promotes and maintains dyadic exchanges and learning about the nature of social partners. The ability to engage in joint attention is crucial for language development.

Individuals who are intentional in their actions display regularity in their behavior. Individuals locate objects with their eyes, move towards the object, and then use hands to make contact with and manipulate the object. Change in gaze direction is one of several behavioral cues that individuals use in combination with changes in facial and vocal displays and body posture to mark the intention to act on an object. Individuals who seek or follow a joint focus of attention display knowledge that what is in their awareness is also in another's awareness. They believe that they are experiencing the same world as others.

Joint attention plays an important role in the development of theory of mind. Theory of mind and joint attention are important precursors to a fully developed grasp of another individual's mental activity. While joint attention is theorized to be an important precursor to theory of mind, some evidence suggests that individuals engage in these tasks separately. One lab tested the co-occurrence of these behavior in social settings and found that there was not significant overlap. This is not to suggest that there is no relationship, but that the two are distinct constructs that must be measured independently.

However, the development of joint attention and theory of mind is not confined to early childhood but continues to be refined throughout the lifespan. The interpretation of an intentional cue such as pointing is dynamically modulated by social and spatial context. Gaze alternation between partner and object, while pointing benefit the ability to locate an object, while absent-mind gaze makes learning an location more challenging. This highlights the importance of communicative cues in modulating joint attention. One lab had adults primed by a cooperative or competitive cue, and either in an addressed or witnessed an interaction. In cooperative cues, participants processed cues differently depending on whether the cue is directed at them or another person, indicating that joint attention is not a reflexive response but an active process of interpreting another's intent based on the immediate social and spatial cues.

=== Language comprehension ===
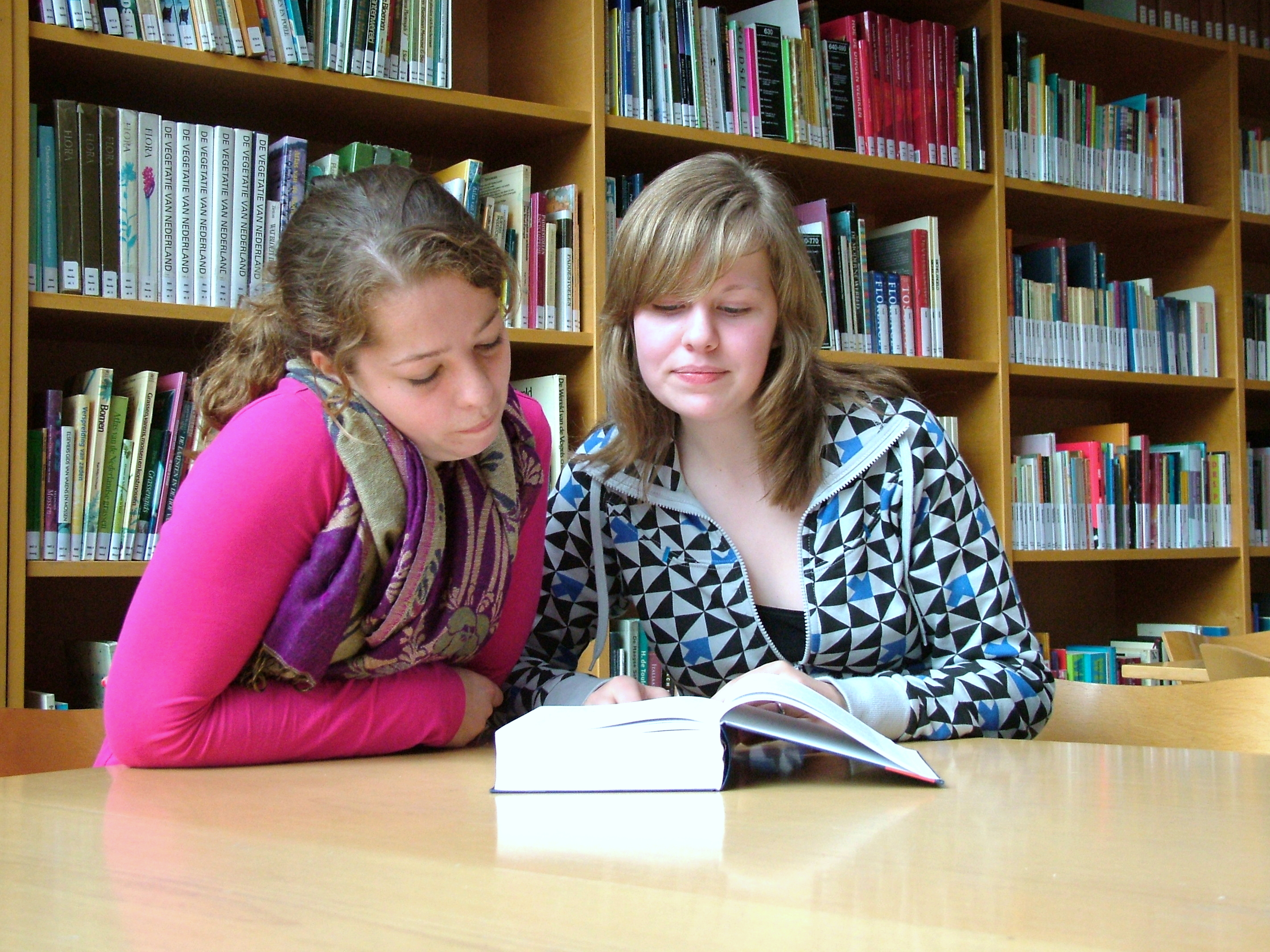
Two teenagers engage in joint attention by reading a book.

The ability of children to extract information from their environment rests on understandings of attentional behaviors such as pointing. Episodes of joint attention provide children with a great deal of information about objects by establishing reference and intention. Joint attention occurs within particular environments. The items and events in that environment provide a context that enables the child to associate meaning with a particular utterance. Joint attention makes relevant aspects of the context salient, helping children comprehend what is taking place. Recent work also links factors involved in the mental representation of language and intentional states, including word knowledge and joint attention, with degree of executive functioning. Researchers found that increases in these kinds of representational abilities at 14 months predicted an increase in success on executive functioning tasks at 18 months. This finding suggests that these abilities are important building blocks for elements of executive functions.

=== Language production ===
An infant's social environment relates to his or her later language development. Children's first words are closely linked to their early language experience. For children with typically developing language skills, there is a close match between maternal speech and their environment: up to 78% of maternal speech is matched to the object the child is focusing on. In children with delayed language development, only 50% of maternal speech is matched to the object the infant is focusing on. Infants are more likely to engage in joint attention when the parent talks about an object that the child is attending to as opposed to an object outside of the infant's attention. This increased level of joint attention aids in encouraging normal language development, including word comprehension and production. When joint attention is present, it plays an important role in word learning, a crucial aspect of language development.

Some recent evidence suggests that though important for speech production, joint attention is not necessary or sufficient for vocabulary production. Individuals on the autism spectrum as well as individuals with Williams syndrome have demonstrated the ability to learn new vocabulary in the absence of joint attention. Additionally, individuals with Down Syndrome often show joint attentional abilities without the expected vocabulary. This demonstrates the plasticity associated with language learning.

=== Relationship to socio-emotional development ===
Joint attention and the ability to attend to an aspect of one's environment are fundamental to normal relationships that rely on the sharing of experience and knowledge. Infants are highly motivated to share experience. An infant's motivation to engage in joint attention is strong enough that infants voluntarily turn away from interesting sights to engage in joint attention with others.

As described in attachment theory, infants need to develop a relationship with a primary caregiver to achieve normal social and emotional development. A key part of the ability to develop this relationship may be joint attention. In addition to language development, joint attention serves the function of preparing infants for more complex social structures involved in adult conversation. Children's skills in initiating and responding to joint attention predict their social competence at 30 months of age. Anticipatory smiling (a low level form of joint attention involving smiling at an object then turning the smile to one's communicative partner) at 9 months positively predicts parent-rated social competence scores at 30 months in infants. Early joint attention abilities account for differences in social and emotional abilities in later life.

Recent work has demonstrated that certain interventions can have a positive impact on the level of joint-attention in which young children are engaging. Children with ASD were enrolled in a behavioral intervention program that involved coordinated group play; researchers found that after several instances of the intervention, many of their clients were consistently engaging in more joint attention.

=== Markers in infancy ===
At the age of 2 months, children engage in dyadic joint attention and conversation-like exchanges with adults during which each is the focus of the other's attention and they take turns exchanging looks, noises and mouth movements. At age 3 months, children display joint attention skills by calling to a caregiver when they are not perceivable. When caregiver does not respond in a similar manner, child exhibits a series of responses that were first studied in early 1970s by Edward Tronick in collaboration with pediatrician T. Berry Brazelton at the time when the latter was creating the Neonatal Behavioral Assessment Scale. At age 6 months, infants display joint attentional skills by:

- Orienting themselves in the same general direction (in their visual field) as another person. Infants also cease to focus on the first interesting (salient) object they encounter.
- Following outward directed gaze of adults.
- Extending more sophisticated behaviors, such as gaze checking, when initial gaze following is not successful.
- Paying more attention to eyes, responding to shifts in eye gaze direction, and directing their own attention based on another's gaze.

At age 8 months, infants demonstrate joint attention through proto-declarative pointing, particularly in girls. At 9 months of age, infants begin to display triadic joint attention. Infants also will display joint attention activities, such as communicative gestures, social referencing, and using the behavior of others to guide response to novel things.

At one year of age, joint attention is displayed through a child's understanding of pointing as an intentional act. One-year-olds also establish joint attention for objects within their visual field before objects beyond their current visual field. At this age, infants are not yet able to represent their entire environment, only what they can see. At age 15 months, children recognize the minds of others. At this age, children also recognize the importance of eyes for seeing and that physical objects can block sight. At age 18 months, infants are capable of following an individual's gaze to outside their visual field and establishing (representative) joint attention. 18-month-olds also grasp the intentional, referential nature of looking, the mentalistic experience of seeing and the role of eyes and are skilled at following both gaze and pointing with precision. At two years of age, children display joint attention by extending attention beyond the present and understanding that the targets of other's attention extends to the past as well. Two-year-olds are also capable of representational thought or increased memory.

=== Individuals with disabilities ===
Several studies have shown that problems with joint attention are associated with developmental processes. Difficulties in establishing joint attention may partially account for differences in social abilities of children with developmental disorders (i.e. autism spectrum disorders). A core deficit noted in autism is eye gaze. Autistic children have difficulty alternating their attention towards a partner and third object. This difficulty is attributed to their deficiencies in following gaze, resulting in difficulty initiating and maintaining joint attention. Deaf infants are able to engage in joint attention similar to hearing infants; however, the time spent engaged in joint attention is often reduced in deaf infants born to hearing parents. Hearing parents of deaf infants often are less likely to respond and expand on their deaf infants' initiative and communicative acts. Deaf infants of deaf parents do not show reduced time spent in joint attention. Auditory input is not critical to joint attention but similar modes of communication and understanding are vital. Furthermore, mothers who are unable to successfully establish regular joint attention with their child rate that infant lower on scales of social competence. Judgement of low social competence can be made as early as 18 months of age. In blind infants, joint attention is established by means of auditory input or feeling another person's hand on an object and may be delayed compared to sighted infants.

=== In fMRI studies ===
A study examining brain activity during engagement in joint attentional tasks was able to suggest some brain areas potentially associated with joint attention. Greater activity in the ventromedial frontal cortex, the left superior frontal gyrus (BA10), cingulate cortex, and caudate nuclei were observed when individuals were engaging in joint attentional activities. Many of these brain regions have been implicated in related mental activities. The ventromedial frontal cortex has been demonstrated to be related to theory of mind type task involving the assignment of mental states to others. Issues in the BA10 areas have been implicated as a possible neurological correlate for autism spectrum disorder which is often characterized by deficits in joint attention. Further research involving eye tracking methods of joint attention found similar neural correlates. Researchers saw increased activation in the right amygdala, the right fusiform gyrus, anterior and dorsal anterior cingulate cortices, striatum, ventral tegmental area, and posterior parietal cortices when participants were engaging in joint attention based on the eye tracking.

Neurophysiological studies in primates

Recent studies have investigated the neural basis of gaze following and joint attention in rhesus monkeys. Neurons in a small area of the posterior superior temporal sulcus, so called the "gaze following patch", have been found to respond to the object that another conspecific is looking at and thereby enabling the observer to establish joint attention. These neurons integrate the other's gaze direction and object of interest in a flexible manner. Properties of these neurons establish the gaze following patch as a key switch in controlling social interactions based on the other's gaze.

== Other animals ==
=== Definitions in non-human animals ===
Triadic joint attention is the highest level of joint attention and involves two individuals looking at an object. Each individual must understand that the other individual is looking at the same object and realize that there is an element of shared attention. As such, it requires that the individuals possess theory of mind. Triadic attention is marked by the individual looking back to the other individual after looking at the object. Dyadic joint attention involves mutual gaze between the parent and infant. Mutual gaze is marked by both the parent and infant looking at each other's face. If two individuals are simply looking at an object, it is referred to as shared gaze.

=== Dyadic joint attention ===
Infant and parent chimpanzees show dyadic joint attention in an affectionate manner by looking at each other's eyes Non-human animals such as Japanese monkeys, baboons, and other Old World monkeys seldom engage in dyadic joint attention. For these animals, the eye contact involved in dyadic joint attention is deemed threatening.

=== Shared gaze ===
Gaze following, or shared gaze, can be found in a number of primates. Domesticated animals such as dogs and horses also demonstrate shared gaze. This type of joint attention is important for animals because gaze shifts serve as indicators alerting the animal to the location of predators, mates, or food.

Though typically it is argued that primate species other than apes do not engage in joint attention, there is some evidence that rhesus monkeys do. In one experiment they were observed to gaze longer at the target of another monkey's gaze than an unrelated object. This offers at least some evidence of their capability to engage in shared gaze.

Chimpanzees are capable of actively locating objects that are the focus of another individual's attention by tracking the gaze of others. They are not limited to following eye gaze to the first interesting object in their view. They use a number of different cues to engage in shared focus, including head movement and eye gaze. Infant chimpanzees start to follow tap, point, and head turn cues of an experimenter by nine months of age. By 13 months of age, they show following responses to glance cues without a head turn. There is no evidence to support that infant chimpanzees are able to use eye gaze alone as a cue for following responses. By 20 months of age, infant chimpanzees are able to follow an experimenter's cues to a target behind the chimpanzee but infant chimpanzees do not look back to the experimenter after looking at the target. Moving targets are more salient than stationary targets for infant chimpanzees. Chimpanzee infants are sensitive to faces which are gazing at them, but chimpanzees less than three to four years old only look within their visual field when using the experimenter's head turn as their cue.

However, the lack of evidence that show chimpanzees may not follow the eye-gaze may be undermined by poor research design and implementation. For instance, nonhuman primates that grow up in a human environment are more likely to follow pointing and gaze, similar to canids. In addition, when comparing animals and humans and they differ by life history stages, they are likely to show a joint attention deficit. But when they are appropriately age-matched and life-history matched, animals and humans show similar joint-attention behaviours. Additionally, there is the issue that the evidence to support claims about absence of effects rarely report correct statistically non-significant results in a clear and formal manner. As a result, researchers are more likely to accept the claims that there is no difference when in fact there is a difference but did not reach statistical significance. Finally, more formal methods are required to assess evidence against theoretical predictions.

== See also ==
- Asperger syndrome
- Cooperative eye hypothesis
- Grounding in communication
- Vocabulary development
