= Pointing =

Gesture

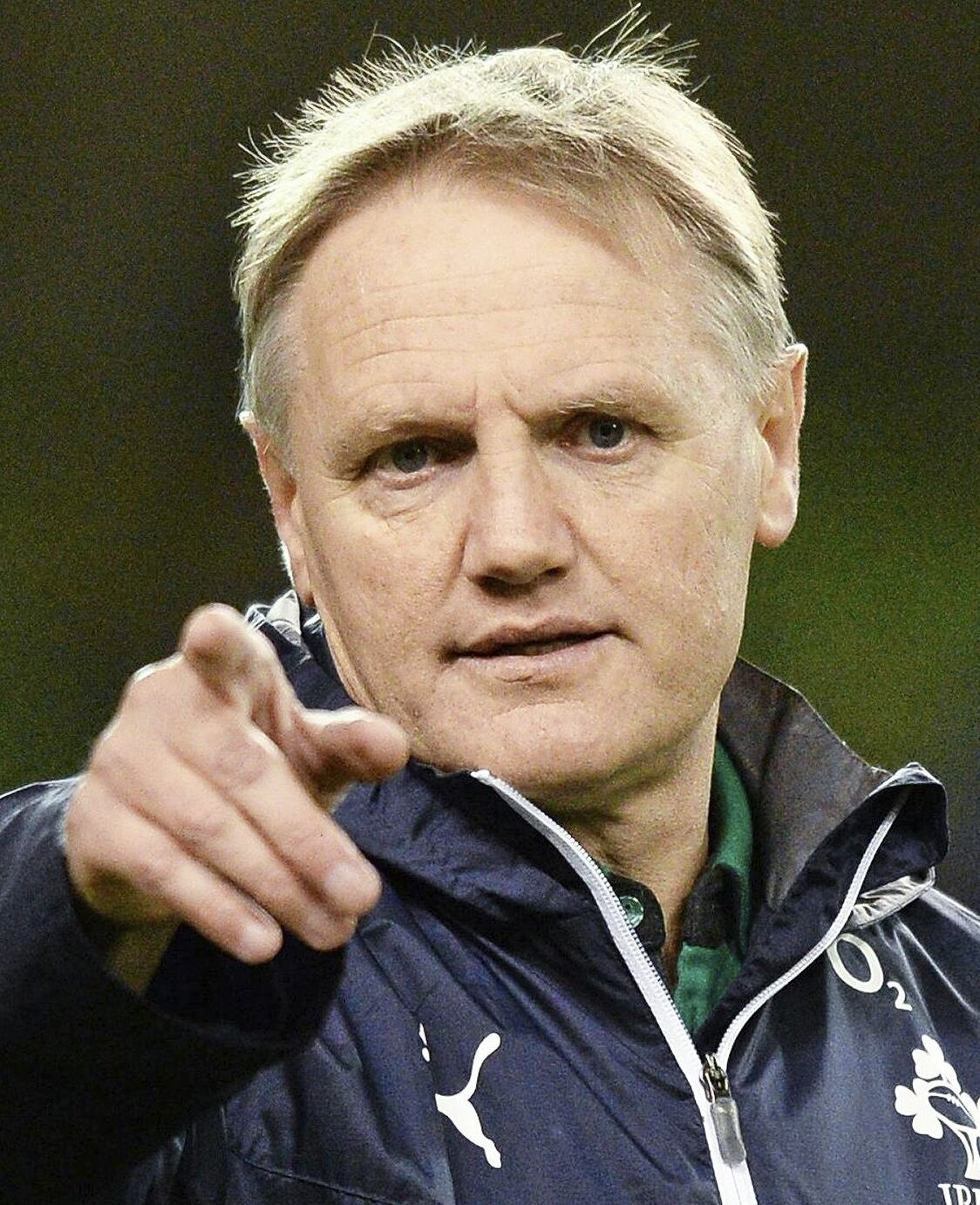
Joe Schmidt pointing during an Ireland national rugby union team training session

Pointing is a gesture specifying a direction from a person's body, usually indicating a location, person, event, thing or idea. It typically is formed by extending the arm, hand, and index finger, although it may be functionally similar to other hand gestures. Types of pointing may be subdivided according to the intention of the person, as well as by the linguistic function it serves.

Pointing typically develops within the first two years of life in humans, and plays an important role in language development and reading in children. It is central to the use of sign language, with a large number of signs being some variation on pointing. The nature of pointing may differ for autistic children or who are deaf, and may also vary by sex at birth. It is typically not observed in children who are blind from birth.

Pointing may vary substantially across cultures, with some having many distinct types of pointing, both with regard to the physical gestures employed and their interpretation. Pointing, especially at other people, may be considered inappropriate or rude in certain contexts and in many cultures. It is generally regarded as a species-specific human feature that does not normally occur in other primates in the wild. It has been observed in animals in captivity; however, there is disagreement on the nature of this non-human pointing.

== Definition and types ==
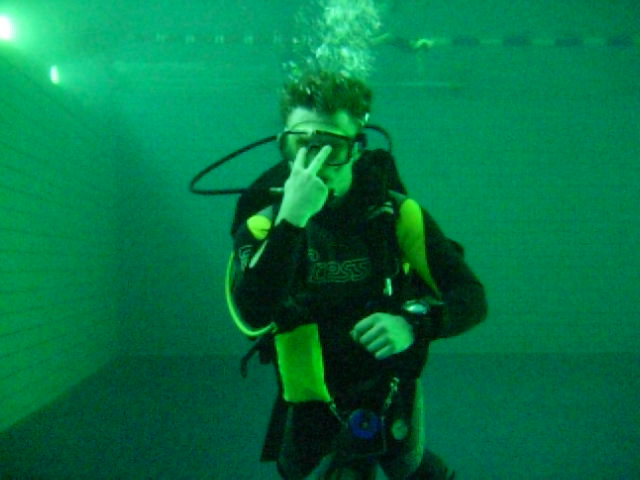
A diver pointing to their eyes as a standard hand symbol that something should be looked at by another

The primary purpose of pointing is to indicate a direction, location, event or thing relative to a person. (Note: "The prototypical pointing gesture is a communicative body movement that projects a vector from a body part. This vector indicates a certain direction, location or object.") Pointing is typically defined as having either three or four essential elements:

1. Extension of the index finger;
2. Flexing the remaining fingers into the palm, possibly with the thumb to the side;
3. Usually, but not always, the pronation of the palm to face downward, or to face the mid-line of the body; and
4. Extension of the arm.

Gestures that do not meet these three or four criteria are usually classified as a "reach" or an "indicative gesture", although there is no clear consensus on how to differentiate between the two. Additionally, there may be little or no behavioral or functional difference depending on whether a gesture is considered to be pointing, reaching, or otherwise indicative, and reaching may be considered a form of whole-hand pointing. In one review, 11 separate definitions were identified for the related motions of reach, reaching out, reaching, indicating, and indicates.

=== Imperative, declarative and interrogative pointing ===
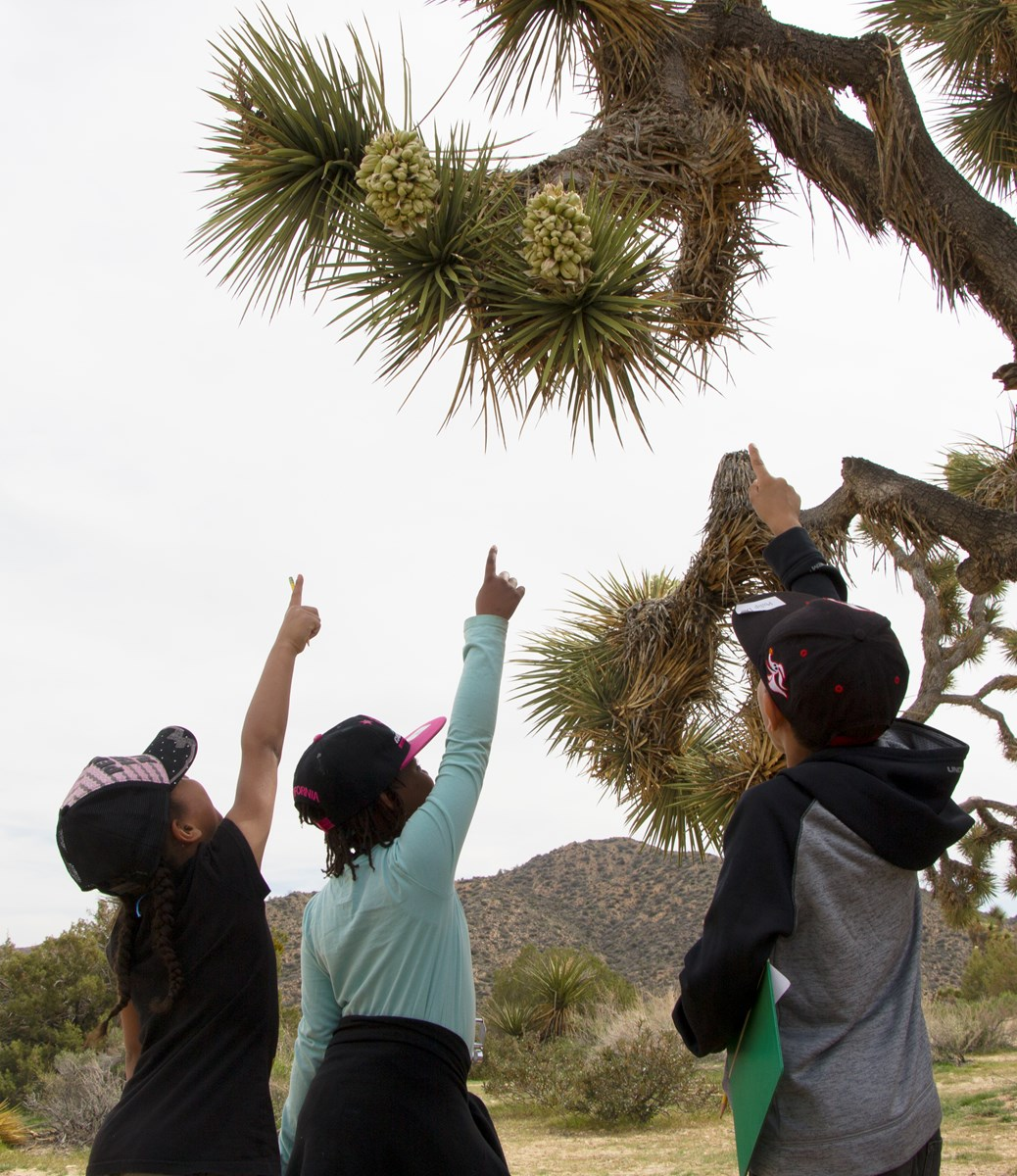
Children pointing at a Joshua Tree in Joshua Tree National Park

Types of pointing are traditionally further divided by purpose, between imperative and declarative pointing. Imperative pointing is pointing to make a request for an object, while declarative pointing is pointing to declare, to comment on an object. As Kovacs and colleagues phrase it, "'Give that to me' vs. 'I like that'". This division is similar to that made by Harris and Butterworth between "giving" and "communicative" pointing. Determining the intention of pointing in infants is done by considering three factors:

1. Whether the behavior is direct toward another,
2. Whether it includes "visual-orientation behaviors" such as observing the recipient of the pointing in addition to the object pointed to, and
3. Whether the gesture is repeated if it fails to achieve the intended effect on the recipient.

Declarative pointing may further be divided into declarative expressive pointing, to express feelings about a thing, and declarative interrogative pointing, to seek information about a thing. However, according to Kovacs and colleagues interrogative pointing is clearly different from declarative pointing, since its function is to gain new information about a referent to learn from a knowledgeable addressee. Therefore, unlike declarative pointing, interrogative pointing implies an asymmetric epistemic relation between communicative partners.

=== Linguistic function ===
Pointing in Chinese Sign Language

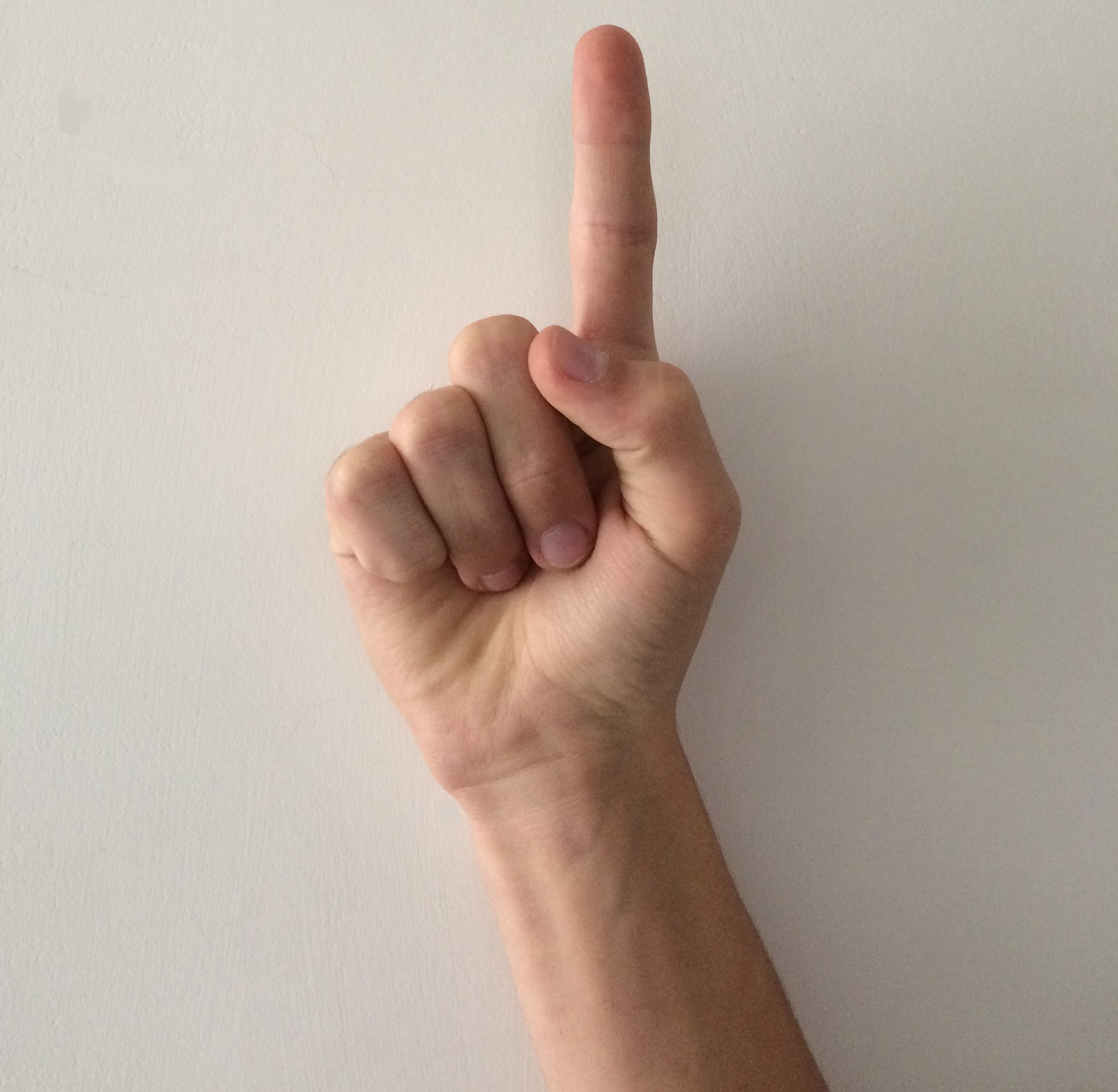
"Number one"

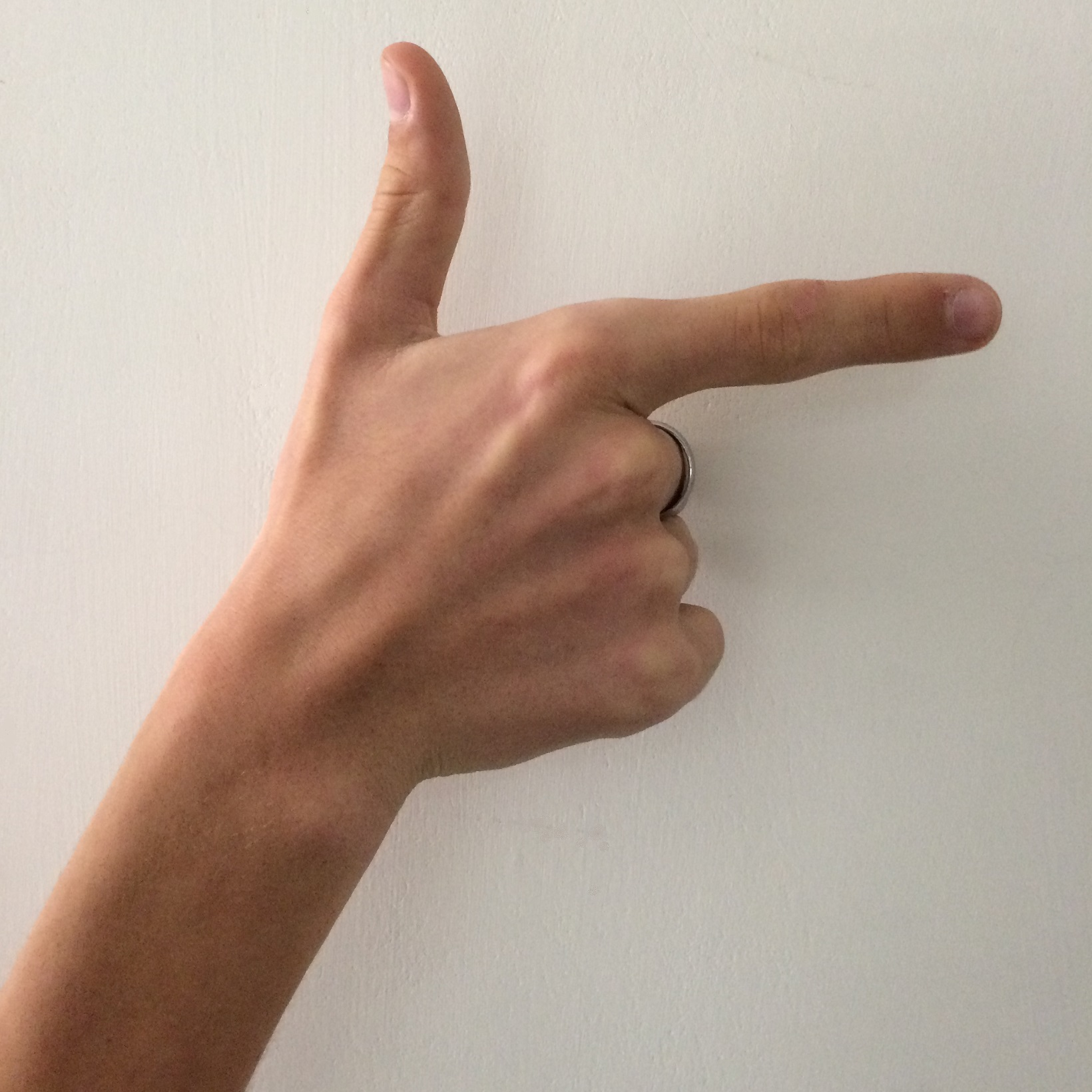
"Number eight"

Types of communicative pointing may be divided by linguistic function into three main groups:

1. Objective pointing: pointing to an object within the visual field of both the pointer and the receiver, such as pointing to a chair which is physically present (Note: "deixis ad oculos et aures", or "referent in the domain of common accessibility of speaker and hearer")
2. Syntactic or anaphoric pointing: pointing to linguistic entities or expressions previously identified, such as pointing to the chair which is not physically present (Note: "to something which is to be looked for and found in places of speech")
3. Imaginative pointing: pointing to things that exist in the imagination, such as pointing to a fictional or remembered chair (Note: "deixis at the phantasma" ... "situations of recollection and imagination similar to perception")

Additionally, pointing in children who are deaf may be divided between deictic or "natural" pointing, which is shared with hearing children, and symbolic pointing used specifically in sign language, learned by observing and imitating others who sign.

== Development ==
Pointing is the first communicative gesture that develops in human infants. It is not clear to what extent the behavior may first emerge as a form of meaningless ritualization, (Note: For example, if an infant receives positive interaction when pointing, they may begin to point as a means of gaining positive interaction itself, and not as a means of intentional communication.) whether some infants may comprehend and visually follow the pointing of others without yet pointing themselves, or whether pointing begins as a form of meaningful imitation, where an infant learns they can produce the same effect in adults as adult produce in them, by mimicking the action of pointing, and drawing attention to an object.

Pointing generally emerges within the first two years of life, weeks prior to a baby's first spoken word, and plays a central role in language acquisition. (Note: "Pointing emerges out of its antecedent behaviors, such as undirected extension of the index finger, several weeks before the first spoken word.") The onset of pointing behavior is typically between seven and 15 months of age, with an average of between 11 months and one year. By eight months, parents reported that 33% of babies exhibited pointing behaviors, with pointing to nearby objects usually occurring by 11 months, and pointing to more distant object by 13 months. By one year of age, more than half of children will exhibit pointing behavior.

As early as 10 months of age, children have been shown to spend more time being attentive to novel objects when they are pointed to by others, when compared to objects that are merely presented to them. This time is increased if the object is also labelled verbally. Pointing by children is associated with a high rate of verbal response from adults, specifically labeling the object pointed to. This interaction allows the child to check for words labeling objects they do not yet know, and, when combined with declarative verbal statements on the part of the child, may allow them verify the accuracy of words they have already learned.

Infants may begin to point in situations where no one else is present, as a form of egocentric expression, termed "pointing-for-self". This is differentiated from "pointing-for-others" which is done while looking at a "recipient" of the pointing, and done as a communicative gesture. Kita specifies this variety of pointing in the context of being a deictic gesture, which is done for the benefit of an audience, as distinct from what are deemed "superficially similar behaviors". Demonstrating this, as they mature infants will first point at an object, and then visually verify whether the recipient is being attentive to the object, and by 15 months of age, will first verify that they have the attention of the recipient, and only then point as a means of redirecting that attention.

Children are more likely to point for adults who respond positively to the gesture. At 16 months they are less likely to point for adults who are shown to be unreliable, adults who have mislabeled objects the children already know the correct word for. (Note: For example, labeling a cat as a ball, citing Begus K, Southgate V. Infant pointing serves an interrogative function. Developmental Science. 2012;15:611–617.) At two years of age, children have been shown to be more likely to point for adults than for children their own age.

=== Protodeclarative and protoimperative pointing ===
There are two main types of pointing seen in young children:

- Protodeclarative pointing: The toddler points to something as an expression of interest, to communicate a sentiment such as "Look at that". Protodeclarative pointing is an important developmental step, because it attempts to initiate joint attention, and uses a developing theory of mind to determine what the other person has seen and might consider interesting enough to look at. For example, if a young child notices an unusual circumstance, such as a bird flying inside the home, they might think that this is worthy of attention, form the belief that their parent had not yet noticed it, and use protodeclarative pointing to draw the adult's attention to the bird.
- Protoimperative pointing: The toddler points to something that they want, to communicate a sentiment such as "I want that". For example, if a young child sees a cookie, they might point to it as a way of communicating that they want to eat the cookie.

In terms of communication and language development, it is the communication itself, rather than the act of pointing per se, that matters. Consequently, children can engage in protodeclarative and protoimperative communication even if they are unable to point or to see pointing (e.g., children who are blind).

=== Relationship with language ===
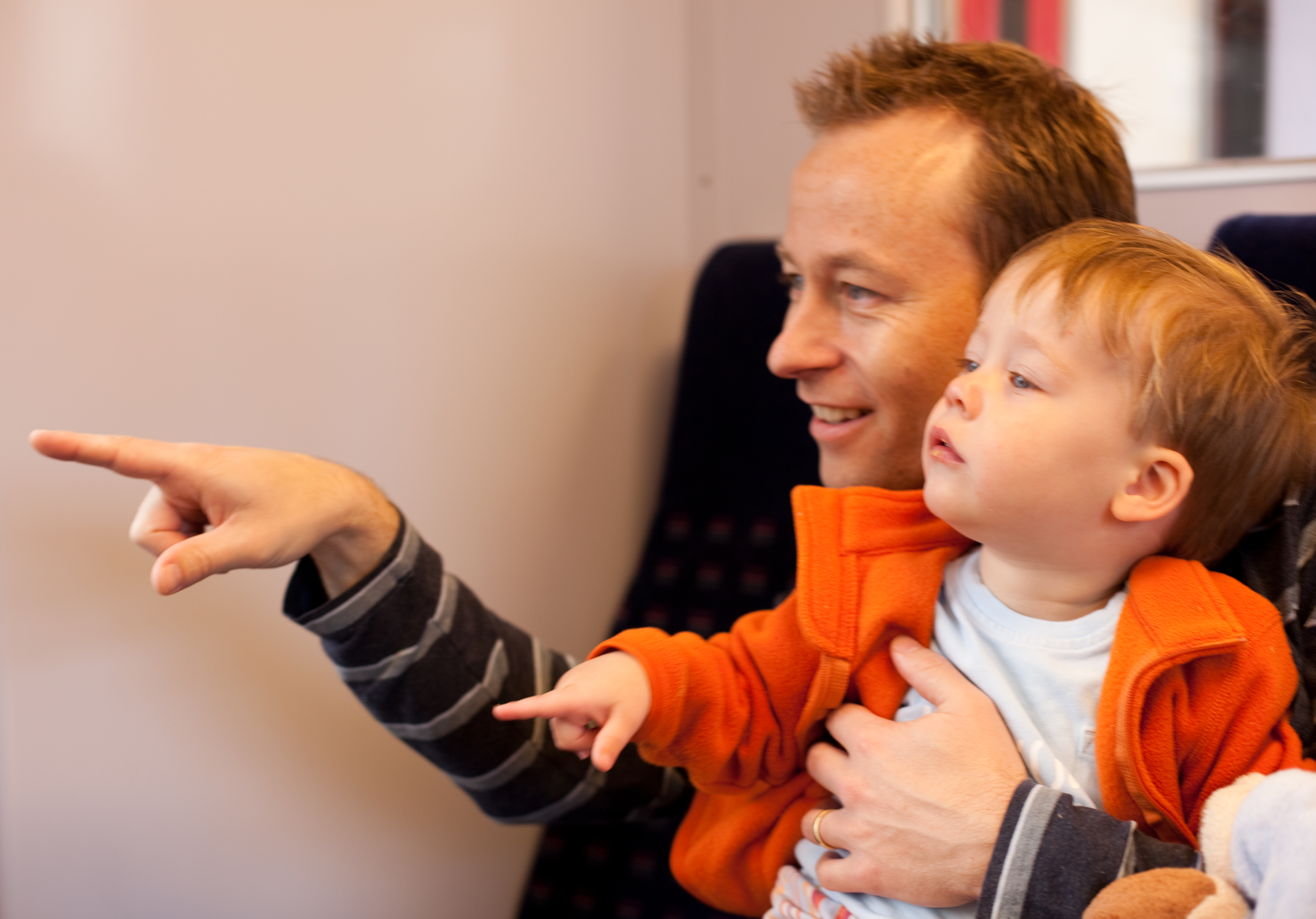
Pointing and labeling objects plays an important role in language acquisition, and children tend to be more attentive to objects pointed to by others, as well as to objects pointed to that are verbally labeled.

A meta-analysis by Colonnesi and colleagues found a strong relationship between pointing and language, including between pointing at an early age and language ability in later life, and pointing at an early age as a predictor of two-word vocal combinations. They concluded that only a "few studies" had not found a strong correlation between pointing and the development of language. Research has also shown that the frequency of communicative pointing from ages 9 months to 12.5 months was positively correlated with vocabulary size for children at age two. (Note: This was true for both users of sign language and spoken word.) The relationship between language development and pointing tends to be stronger in studies which examined declarative pointing specifically or pointing generally, rather than imperative pointing.

In school age children, finger-pointing-reading (reading while pointing to words or letters as they are spoken) can play an important role in reading development, by helping to emphasize the association between the spoken and printed word, and encouraging children to be attentive to the meaning of text.

==== Deaf speakers of sign language ====
Pointing plays an important role in sign language, which as much as 25% of signs being a variation of pointing. (Note: "...pointing is ubiquitous in our day-to-day interactions with others. ...Even when we talk about the referents that are distance in space and time, we often point to the seemingly empty space in front of us. ...'every four signs in signed discourse is a pointing sign'") Children who are deaf have been shown to begin pointing at a similar age to non-deaf children, but this did not confer any advantage in the acquisition of pronouns in American Sign Language.

Initial observations give some indication that deaf children acquiring the use of American Sign Language (ASL) may exhibit self-pointing behavior earlier than hearing children who are acquiring speech. Pointing to a location begins being deictic for deaf children and hearing alike, but becomes lexicalized for more mature signers. There is a distinction between linguistic pointing in ASL and gestural pointing by deaf users, the latter being identical for deaf and hearing people.

One small-scale study found that the errors in pointing behavior produced by autistic deaf children and autistic hearing children were similar. Both deaf and hearing children use pointing abundantly while learning language, and initially for the same reason, although that starts to diverge as deaf children acquire signs. Pre-speaking hearing infants use pointing extensively, and use a combination of one word plus one gesture (mostly pointing) before they can produce a two-word sentence. Another study looked at deaf Japanese infants acquiring language from ages four months to two years, and found that the infants moved from duos (where a point plus an iconic sign referred to the same thing) to two-sign combinations where they referred to two different things. As they grew, the latter grew more frequent and led to the development of two-sign sentences in Japanese Sign Language.

==== Autistic people ====
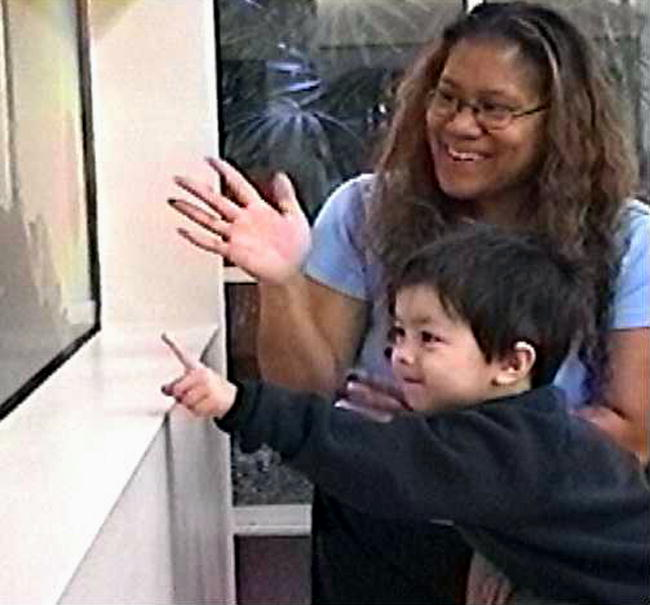
A woman along with an autistic child pointing at fish in an aquarium

Autistic children show marked differences compared to others, and greater difficulty in their ability to interpret pointing as a form of communication, and a sign of "something interesting". This is similar to difficulties they may experience with other deictic communication, which depend on an interpretation of the relationship between speaker and listener or on particular spatial references. A lack of declarative or proto-declarative pointing and the inability to follow a point are important diagnostic criteria for autistic children, and have been incorporated into screening tools such as the Modified Checklist for Autism in Toddlers.

=== Other factors ===
Pointing is dependent on vision, and is not observed in children who are blind from birth. Blind children communicate the same meanings as protoimperative and protodeclarative pointing through non-visual forms of expression, such as touch (e.g., placing a parent's hand on an object).

A number of differences have been observed regarding the onset of pointing behavior and sex at birth, and the tendency to point using the right or left hand, with AFAB children being more likely to point up to 15 degrees into the left visual periphery using their right hand, and being ambidextrous further to the left, while AMAB children are typically ambidextrous for 15 degrees to the left and right of center. Pointing at remembered targets can be impaired in cognitive impairment due to dementia.

== Cultural variations ==
The gestures used for pointing and their interpretation vary among different cultures. While studies have observed index finger pointing in infants across a range of cultures, because those studied are also ones where adults frequently use this type of pointing, further study is needed to determine whether these are examples of imitation of behaviors performed by observed adults, or whether it indicates pointing may be biologically determined. (Note: "Is infants' index-finger pointing a biologically programmed choice? ... A more conclusive answer to these questions requires a future study ... in a culture where adults do not use index-finger pointing at all or do so only rarely.")

In much of the world, pointing with the index finger is considered rude or disrespectful, especially pointing to a person. Pointing with the left hand is taboo in some cultures. Pointing with an open hand is considered more polite or respectful in some contexts. In Nicaragua, pointing is frequently done with the lips in a "kiss shape" directed towards the object of attention.

Different cultures may point using a range of variations on index finger pointing. In Japan, pointing is done with the fingers together and the palm facing upwards. Those of Indian heritage may point using the chin, whole hand, or thumb. They may consider index finger pointing rude, but further distinguish a point using two fingers for use only at someone considered inferior. In those living near the Vaupés River, Dixon noted at least three distinct types of pointing:

pointing with the lips for "visible and near" ... pointing with the lips plus a backwards tilt of the head for "visible and not near" ... pointing with the index finger for "not visible" (if the direction in which the object lies is known)

Alternatively, among Aboriginal Australian speakers of Arrernte, researchers identified six distinct types of pointing: index finger, open hand palm down, open hand palm vertical, "'horn-hand' pointing (with the thumb, the index finger and the pinkie extended)", pointing with a protruded lip, and pointing with the eye.

When pointing to indicate a position in time, many, but not all cultures tend to point toward the front to indicate events in the future, and toward the back to indicate events in the past. One noted exception is that of speakers of Aymara, who instead tend to associate what is in the past, what is known, with what is in the front, what is seen, and vice versa.

== In non-human animals ==
There is considerable disagreement as to the nature of pointing behaviors in non-human animals. Miklósi and Soproni described pointing as a "species specific, human communicative gesture" not regularly used by any other species of primates living in the wild. Kita concluded similarly that "on the evidence to date only humans use the pointing gesture declarative to share attention with conspecifics." Kovács and colleagues state "pointing as a referential communicative act seems to be unique to human behavior." (Note: Referencing Tomasello M. Why We Collaborate? MIT Press; Cambridge: 2009.)

However, the claims that pointing is a unique human gesture have not gone unchallenged. A study in 1998 by Veà and Sabater-Pi described examples of explicit declarative pointing in bonobos in what is now the Democratic Republic of the Congo through these observations: "Noises are heard coming from the vegetation. A young male swings from a branch and leaps into a tree... He emits sharp calls, which are answered by other individuals who are not visible. He points – with his right arm stretched out and his hand half closed except for his index and ring fingers – to the position of the two groups of camouflaged observers who are in the undergrowth." This was one of the only observations of pointing in the wild by primates for years, but recently other possible examples have been documented. Researchers claimed to observe imperative pointing gestures produced by bonobos when attempting to initiate genital rubbing, as well as by chimpanzees when reaching towards objects they desired, although even these researchers admitted the rarity of chimpanzee pointing in the wild. In the wild, both chimpanzees and bonobos have been shown to seemingly signal and gesture to direct each other's attention, through acts like beckoning and "directed scratching." Thus, while it is clear that other primates use gestures to direct attention, it is still uncertain as to whether this is done overtly as in humans through pointing.

Although the question of whether primates point in the wild is still up for debate, pointing in captivity is widely established in primates. Leavens and Hopkins note that pointing behavior has been observed in captivity for a range of species. In some, such as apes, the majority of such behavior is spontaneous (meaning without explicit training to do so), but occurs only rarely in others, such as monkeys. When present, this may be accompanied by visual monitoring of the person being interacted with, the audience of their gesture, rather than being attentive only to the object pointed at. Moreover, it seems that non-human great apes also take the perspective of the communicative partner in order to produce clear, unambiguous points. Studies have found that apes point with the dual goal of directing attention and requesting food, and additionally that they are sensitive to the looking behavior in response to their pointing gestures. There remain questions as to whether this constitutes "true pointing", and whether non-humans have the social or cognitive abilities to understand the intentional communicative nature of pointing. These questions arise especially due to the nature of these primate pointing gestures. They are only produced for humans and not for other apes, and often use the full hand instead of the typical extended index finger that humans use. However, this may be countered with observations in apes trained to use sign language, which do point with the index finger. Recently, studies have also indicated that chimpanzees in captivity use pointing as a flexible signal, by raising their arms in order to point to objects that are further away. Thus, while apes certainly can point, it is difficult to ascertain whether they point naturally. However, this debate may result from the fact that there are procedural differences in how non-human primates are tested, making it more difficult to ascertain if non-human primates do point. The experimenter must be safe, as a result of testing non-human primates, thus a barrier is introduced between the participant and experimenter. Dogs and infants do not have this precaution. However, Udell and colleagues tested dogs with and without a fence, using the object choice task in a similar manner to that of a barrier. The authors reported that the barrier produced a decrease of 31% in terms of success for canines. This has also been shown in pointing as well, where barriers that are present for dogs showed lower success rates than when absent, highlighting that this debate may be partially the result of systematic procedural differences.

In contrast to the production of pointing, some non-human animal species can appropriately respond to pointing gestures, preferring an object or direction, which was previously indicated by the gesture. Cats, elephants, ferrets, horses and seals can follow the pointing gesture of a human above chance, while dogs can rely on different types of human points and their performance is comparable to that of two-year-old toddlers in a similar task. However, it seems, that the default function of pointing is different in dogs and humans, because pointing actions refer to particular locations or directions for dogs in an imperative manner, while these gestures usually indicate specific objects in humans to ask for new information or to comment on an object.

There is considerable debate as to whether apes are able to comprehend pointing gestures as well, and it has even been argued that dogs are better able to understand pointing than apes. Some hypothesize that pointing comprehension should be more prevalent in species with a stronger tendency to cooperate, which would explain negative results in apes due to the mainly competitive relationship present in most species of apes and monkeys. However, wolves fare poorly in pointing comprehension tests as well, and are a highly cooperative species, countering this hypothesis. More recent studies have refuted the claim that apes are poor at comprehending pointing, and provide evidence that the tests used to evaluate pointing comprehension are often inaccurate, especially in apes. Thus there is conflicting evidence and debate as to whether apes fully comprehend pointing gestures.

== Pointing with the eyes ==
Humans, having large and prominent sclera (the whites of the eyes) can point with their eyes. When a person moves just their eyes to look to the side (or up or down) rather than forward, without changing the direction of the face, the contrast between the dark irises and the large sclera makes the target of the gaze especially apparent. Although quite different physically than pointing with the finger or other body part, the purpose and effect may be similar.

This way of pointing, directing the attention of another person in a given direction without turning the head or making a gesture, can be useful at times. A study at the Tokyo Institute of Technology suggests that being able to quickly tell the direction of someone's gaze is an important part of non-verbal communication. Eye pointing may also be used to surreptitiously signal the presence and location of a danger.

== See also ==
- Deixis, words and phrases that cannot be fully understood without additional contextual information
- Finger gun, a similar hand gesture
- Joint attention, shared focus of two people on an object, resulting from pointing or other cues
- List of gestures used in non-verbal communication
- Ostensive definition, conveys the meaning of a term by pointing out examples
- Pointing breed, dogs trained to find and indicate the direction of game
- Pointing device, an input interface for inputting spatial data into a computer
- Semiotics, the study of meaning-making, sign process, and meaningful communication
- Sign (semiotics), something that communicates a meaning that is not the sign itself
