= Infancy (journal) =

- Discipline: Developmental psychology
- Language: English
- Edited by: John Colombo

Publication details
- History: 2000–present
- Publisher: Wiley-Blackwell
- Frequency: Bimonthly
- Impact factor: 1.873 (2017)

Standard abbreviations
- ISO 4: Infancy

Indexing
- ISSN: 1525-0008 (print); 1532-7078 (web)

Links
- Journal homepage; Online access; Online archive

Infancy is a bimonthly peer-reviewed scientific journal covering developmental psychology in infancy, which it defines as the first two years of life. It was established in 2000 and is published by Wiley-Blackwell on behalf of the International Congress of Infant Studies, of which it is the official journal.

The editor-in-chief is John Colombo (University of Kansas). According to the Journal Citation Reports, the journal has a 2017 impact factor of 1.873, ranking it 35th out of 73 journals in the category "Psychology, Developmental".
