= Social competence =

Skills needed for successful social adaptation

Social competence consists of social, emotional, cognitive, and behavioral skills needed for successful social adaptation. Social competence also reflects having the ability to take another's perspective concerning a situation, learn from past experiences, and apply that learning to the changes in social interactions.

Social competence is the foundation upon which expectations for future interaction with others are built and perceptions of an individual's own behavior are developed. Social competence frequently encompasses social skills, social communication, and interpersonal communication. Competence is directly connected to social behavior, such as social motives, abilities, skills, habits, and knowledge. All of these social factors contribute to the development of a person's behavior.

== History ==
The study of social competence began in the early 20th century with research into how children interact with their peers and function in social situations. In the 1930s, researchers began investigating peer groups and how children's characteristics affected their positions within these peer groups. In the 1950s and 1960s, research established that children's social competence was related to future mental health (such as maladaptive outcomes in adulthood), as well as problems in school settings. Research on social competence expanded greatly from this point on, as increasing amounts of evidence demonstrated the importance of social interactions. Social competence began to be viewed in terms of problem-solving skills and strategies in social situations, and was conceptualized in terms of effective social functioning and information processing. In the 1970s and 1980s, research began focusing on the impact of children's behavior on relationships, which influenced the study of the effectiveness of teaching children social skills that are age, gender, and context-specific.

In an effort to determine the reason for some children's lack of social skills in certain interactions, new well developed social information processing models to explain the dynamics of social interaction. These models focused on factors such as behavior, the way people perceive and evaluate each other, and the processing of social cues. They also examined the selection of social goals, decision-making processes, and the implementation of chosen responses. Studies like these often examined the correlation between social cognition and social competence.

A prominent researcher of social competence in the mid-1980s was Frank Gresham. He identified three sub-domains of social competence: adaptive behavior, social skills, and peer acceptance (peer acceptance is often used to assess social competence). Research during this time often focused on children who were not displaying social skills in an effort to identify and help these children who were potentially at risk of long-term negative outcomes due to poor social interactions. Gresham proposed that these children could have one of four deficits: skill deficits, in which children did not have the knowledge or cognitive abilities to carry out a certain behavior, performance deficits, self-control skill deficits, and self-control performance deficits, in which children had excessive anxiety or impulsivity that prohibited proper execution of the behaviors or skills they knew and understood.

Despite all the developments and changes in the conceptualization of social competence throughout the 20th century, there was still a general lack of agreement about the definition and measurement of social competence during the 1980s. The definitions of the 1980s were less ambiguous than previous definitions, but they often did not acknowledge the age, situation, and skill specificity implicit in the complex construct of social competence.

== Approaches and theories ==
=== Peer regard/status approaches ===
These approaches define social competence based on how popular one is with his peers. The more well-liked one is, the more socially competent they are.

Peer group entry, conflict resolution, and maintaining play, are three comprehensive interpersonal goals that are relevant with regard to the assessment and intervention of peer competence.

=== Social skill approaches ===
These approaches use behaviors as a guideline. Behaviors that demonstrate social skills are compiled and collectively identified as social competence.

=== Relationship approaches ===
According to these approaches, social competence is assessed by the quality of one's relationships and the ability to form relationships. Competence depends on the skills of both members of the relationship; a child may appear more socially competent if interacting with a socially skilled partner. Commentators on some online incel communities have advocated government programs wherein socially awkward men are helped or women are incentivized to go on dates with them.

=== Functional approaches ===
The functional approach is context-specific and concerned with the identification of social goals and tasks. This approach also focuses on the outcomes of social behavior and the processes leading to those outcomes. The importance of information-processing models of social skills in these approaches is based on the idea that social competence results from social-cognitive processes.

== Models ==
Early models of social competence stress the role of context and situation specificity in operationalizing the competence construct. These models also allow for the organization and integration of the various component skills, behaviors, and cognitions associated with social competence. Whereas global definitions focus on the "ends" rather than the "means" by which such ends are achieved, a number of models directly attend to the theorized processes underlying competence. These process models are context-specific and seek to identify critical social goals and tasks associated with social competence. Other models focus on the often overlooked distinction between social competence and the indices (i.e., skills and abilities) used to gauge it.

=== Behavioral–analytic model ===
Goldfried and D'Zurilla developed a five-step behavioral-analytic model outlining a definition of social competence.

The specific steps proposed in the model include: (1) situational analysis, (2) response enumeration, (3) response evaluation, (4) measure development, and (5) evaluation of the measure.

1. Situation analysis – a critical situation is defined on the basis of certain criteria, which include:
  1. occurs with some frequency
  2. presents a difficult response decision
  3. results in a range of possible responses in a given population. Situation identification and analysis is accomplished through a variety of methods, including direct observation by self or others, interviews, and surveys.
2. Response enumeration – a sampling of possible responses to each situation is obtained. Procedures for generating response alternatives include direct observation, role plays, and simulations in video and/or written formats.
3. Response evaluation – the enumerated responses are judged for effectiveness by "significant others" in the environment. An important element is that a consensus must emerge, or the particular item is removed from future consideration.

In the last two steps (4 and 5), a measure for assessing social competence is developed and evaluated.

=== Social information-processing model ===
A social information-processing model is a widely used means for understanding social competence. The social information-processing model focuses more directly on the cognitive processes underlying response selection, enactment, and evaluation. Using a computer metaphor, the reformulated social information-processing model outlines a six-step nonlinear process with various feedback loops linking children's social cognition and behavior. Difficulties arising at any of the steps generally translate into social competence deficits.

The six steps are:

1. Observation and encoding of relevant stimuli – attending to and encoding non-verbal and verbal social cues, both external and internal.
2. Interpretation and mental representation of cues – understanding what has happened during the social encounter, as well as the cause and intent underlying the interaction.
3. Clarification of goals – determining what one's objective is for the interaction and how to put forth an understanding of those goals.
4. Representation of a situation is developed by accessing long-term memory or construction – the interaction is compared to previous situations stored in long-term memory and the previous outcomes of those interactions.
5. Response decision/selection
6. Behavioral enactment and evaluation

=== Tri-component model ===
Another way to conceptualize social competence is to consider three underlying subcomponents in a hierarchical framework.

1. Social Adjustment
2. Social Performance
3. Social Skills

The top of the hierarchy includes the most advanced level, social adjustment. Social adjustment is defined as the extent to which an individual achieves society's developmentally appropriate goals. The goals are conceived of as different "statuses" to be achieved by members of a society (e.g., health, legal, academic, or occupational, socioeconomic, social, emotional, familial, and relational statuses). The next level is social performance – or the degree to which an individual's responses to relevant social situations meet socially valid criteria. The lowest level of the hierarchy is social skills, which are defined as specific abilities (i.e., overt behavior, social cognitive skills, and emotional regulation) allowing for competent performance within social tasks. The tri-component model is useful for doctors and researchers looking to change, predict, or elaborate social functioning of children.

=== The quadripartite model ===
The essential core elements of competence are theorized to consist of four superordinate sets of skills, abilities, and capacities: (1) cognitive skills and abilities, (2) behavioral skills, (3) emotional competencies, and (4) motivational and expectancy sets.

1. Cognitive skills and abilities – cultural and social knowledge necessary for effective functioning in society (i.e., academic and occupational skills and abilities, decision-making ability, and the processing of information)
2. Behavioral skills – knowledge of behavioral responses and the ability to enact them (i.e., negotiation, role- or perspective-taking, assertiveness, conversational skills, and prosocial skills)
3. Emotional skills – affect regulation and affective capacities for facilitating socially competent responding and forming relationships
4. Motivational and expectancy sets – an individual's value structure, moral development, and sense of efficacy and control.

== The developmental framework ==
Social competence develops over time, and the mastery of social skills and interpersonal social interactions emerge at various time points on the developmental continuum (infancy to adolescence) and build on previously learned skills and knowledge. Key facets and markers of social competence that are remarkably consistent across the developmental periods (early childhood, middle/late childhood, adolescence) include prosocial skills (i.e., friendly, cooperative, helpful behaviors) and self-control or regulatory skills (i.e., anger management, negotiation skills, problem-solving skills). However, as developmental changes occur in the structure and quality of interactions, as well as in cognitive and language abilities, these changes affect the complexity of skills and behaviors contributing to socially competent responding.

== Contributing factors ==
=== Temperament ===
Temperament is a construct that describes a person's biological response to the environment. Issues such as soothability, rhythmicity, sociability, and arousal make up this construct. Most often sociability contributes to the development of social competence.

Mary Rothbart holds the most influential model of temperament due to the two main focuses on regulation and reactivity. Effort control is the main idea behind temperament regulation because the skills it requires are involved in integrating information, planning, and emotion modulation and behavior. Reactivity pertains to the provocation of motor, affective, and sensory response systems.

=== Attachment ===
Social experiences rest on the foundation of parent-child relationships and are important in later developing social skills and behaviors. An infant's attachment to a caregiver is important for developing later social skills and behaviors that develop social competence. Attachment helps the infant learn that the world is predictable and trustworthy or, in other instances, capricious and cruel. Ainsworth describes four attachment styles in infancy, including secure, anxious–avoidant, anxious–resistant, and disorganized/disoriented. The foundation of the attachment bond allows the child to venture out from their mother to try new experiences and interactions. Children with secure attachment styles tend to show higher levels of social competence relative to children with insecure attachment, including anxious-avoidant, anxious–resistant, and disorganized/disoriented.

=== Parenting style ===
Parents are the primary source of social and emotional development in infancy, early, and middle/late childhood. The socialization practices of parents influence whether their child will develop social competence. Parenting style captures two essential elements of parenting: parental warmth/responsiveness and parental control/demandingness. Parental responsiveness (warmth or supportiveness) refers to "the extent to which parents intentionally foster individuality, self-regulation, and self-assertion by being attuned, supportive, and acquiescent to children's special needs and demands." Parental demandingness (behavioral control) refers to "the claims parents make on children to become integrated into the family whole, by their maturity demands, supervision, disciplinary efforts and willingness to confront the child who disobeys." Categorizing parents according to whether they are high or low on parental demandingness and responsiveness creates a typology of four parenting styles: indulgent/permissive, authoritarian, authoritative, and indifferent/uninvolved. Each parenting styles reflects patterns of parental values, practices, and behaviors and a distinct balance of responsiveness and demandingness.

Parenting style contributes to child well-being in the domains of social competence, academic performance, psychosocial development, and problem behavior. Research based on parent interviews, child reports, and parent observations consistently finds that:

- Children and adolescents whose parents are authoritative rate themselves and are rated by objective measures as more socially and instrumentally competent than those whose parents are nonauthoritative.
- Children and adolescents whose parents are uninvolved perform most poorly in all domains.

Other factors that contribute to social competence include teacher relationships, peer groups, neighborhood, and community.

== Related problem behaviors ==
An important researcher in the study of social competence, Voeller, states that three clusters of problem behaviors lead to the impairment of social competence. Voeller clusters include: (1) an aggressive and hostile group, (2) a perceptual deficits subgroup, and (3) a group with difficulties in self-regulation.

1. Children with aggressive and hostile behaviors are those whose acting out behaviors negatively influence their ability to form relationships and sustain interpersonal interactions. Aggressive and hostile children tend to have deficiencies in social information processing and employ inappropriate social problem-solving strategies to social situations. They also tend to search for fewer facts in a social situation and pay more attention to the aggressive social interactions presented in an interaction.
2. Children with perceptual deficits do not perceive the environment appropriately and interpret interpersonal interactions inaccurately. They also have difficulty reading social cues, facial expressions, and body gestures.
3. Children with self-regulation deficits tend to have classic difficulties in executive functions.

== Assessments ==
While understanding the components of social competence continues to be empirically validated, the assessment of social competence is not well-studied and continues to develop in procedures. There are a variety of methods for the assessment of social competence and often include one (or more) of the following:

- Child–adolescent interview
- Observations
- Parent report measures
- Self-report measures
- Sociometric measures (i.e., peer nominations)
- Teachers report measures

== Interventions ==
Following the increased awareness of the importance of social competence in childhood, interventions are used to help children with social difficulties. Historically, these efforts did not improve children's peer status or yield long-lasting effects. However, these interventions also did not take into consideration that social competence problems do not occur in isolation, but alongside other problems. Thus, current intervention efforts tend to target social competence both directly and indirectly in different contexts.

=== Preschool and early-childhood interventions ===
Early childhood interventions targeting social skills directly improve the peer relations of children. These interventions focus on at-risk groups such as single, adolescent mothers and families of children with early behavior problems. Interventions targeting both children and families have the highest success rates. When children reach preschool age, social competence interventions focus on the preschool context and teach prosocial skills. Such interventions generally entail teaching problem-solving and conflict-management skills, sharing, and improving parenting skills. Interventions improve children's social competence and interactions with peers in the short term and they also reduce long-term risks, such as substance abuse or delinquent behavior.

=== School-age interventions ===
Social competence becomes more complicated as children grow older, and most intervention efforts for this age group target individual skills, the family, and the classroom setting. These programs focus on training skills in problem-solving, emotional understanding, cooperation, and self-control. Understanding one's emotions, and the ability to communicate these emotions, is strongly emphasized. The most effective programs give children the opportunity to practice the new skills that they learn. Results of social competence interventions include decreased aggression, improved self-control, and increased conflict resolution skills.

=== Intervention Program ===
The social competence intervention program (SCIP) is a pilot program that uses more than one sense at a time throughout the intervention so the person becomes aware of their own thought process. Before running the intervention, it was assumed that some children have perception deficits along with poor social skills. Theater classes were taken to remedy these deficits in children who have learning disabilities and attention deficit disorders. At the conclusion of the study, evidence shows that participating children began to evolve their metacognitive skills such as feelings and behaviors.

== See also ==
- Social skills
