= Edward Tronick =

American developmental psychologist

- Education: Cornell University (BS, MS); University of Wisconsin (PhD)
- Occupation: Developmental psychologist

Edward Tronick is an American developmental psychologist best known for his studies of infants, carried out in 1970s, showing that when the connection between an infant and caregiver is broken, the infant tries to engage the caregiver, and then, if there is no response, the infant pulls back – first physically and then emotionally. He is a Director of Child Development Unit and Distinguished Professor at the University of Massachusetts Boston. He is a research associate in Newborn Medicine, a lecturer at Harvard Medical School, an associate professor at both the Graduate School of Education and the School of Public Health at Harvard. He is a member of the Boston Psychoanalytic Society and Institute, a past member of the Boston 'Process of Change' Group and a Founder and faculty member of the Touchpoints program. His research is funded by NICHD and NSF. Dr. Tronick along with Dr. Kristie Brandt founded the Infant-Parent Mental Health Postgraduate Certificate program. Fellows spent 12 interactive, intensive 3-day weekends meeting every other month at the University of Massachusetts' Boston Campus, to learn first hand from world luminaries and program faculty as well as each other. The program prepares professionals from multi-disciplinary backgrounds for certification in infant –family and early childhood mental health specialists.

== Education ==
Tronick received a Bachelor of Science in 1964 and a Master of Science in comparative psychology and perception in 1965 from Cornell University. He received a Doctor of Philosophy in developmental psychology and neurophysiology from the University of Wisconsin in 1968.

== Research ==
Examining newborns and infants up to two months old, together with T. Berry Brazelton, when the latter was working on his Neonatal Behavioral Assessment Scale (NBAS), Tronick made several experiments, the most notable among which was "The Still Face Experiment". Recent studies have found that four-month-old infants, when re-exposed to the Still Face two weeks after the first time, show rapid physiological changes that were not present when they were exposed to it the first time.

== In media ==
He has appeared on national radio and television programs.

== Selected publications ==
He has published more than 200 scientific articles and 4 books.

- 2007 'The Neurobehavioral and Social-emotional Development of Infants and Children', W. W. Norton & Company, 571 pp, ISBN 9780393705171
