= Larissa Samuelson =

American psychologist and academic

- Education: Indiana University Bloomington
- Occupations: Professor of Psychology, University of East Anglia
- Awards: APA Distinguished Scientific Early Career Contributions to Psychology

Larissa Samuelson is an American psychologist known for her exploration in the fields of word learning, cognitive development, and the use of dynamic systems as a framework for understanding the developmental process. She is professor at the School of Psychology of the University of East Anglia.

Samuelson was the recipient of the 2010 Award for Distinguished Scientific Early Career Contributions to Psychology (area: Developmental Psychology) from the American Psychological Association.

== Biography ==
Samuelson received a bachelor of science with honors in 1993 and a joint Ph.D. in psychology and Cognitive Science from Indiana University in 2000, where she worked under the supervision of Linda B. Smith. From 2000 to 2015, she was faculty of the Department of Psychology at the University of Iowa. She and her husband, John Spencer, joined the faculty of School of Psychology at the University of East Anglia in 2015. Samuelson's research has been funded by grants from the National Institute of Child Health and Human Development.

== Research ==
Samuelson and her associates have conducted numerous studies of word learning in toddlers examining the basis for children's extensions of nouns to novel referents. These and earlier studies suggest that toddlers operate with a "shape bias" that prompts them to generalize usage of count nouns to other objects of the same shape, for example by referring to a zebra as a horse. Samuelson and her colleagues claim that children are "biased to attend to the shape of solid rigid objects when learning novel names." This association between count nouns and shape is learned as children develop their early noun vocabularies, resulting in their attention being drawn to shape as a common organizing principle.

Samuelson's lab has examined conditions under which children will generalize usage of a noun based on various features in addition to shape, such as material. In one of her studies, Samuelson and her colleagues gave 16-month-olds a variety of substances, including applesauce, pudding, soup and juice. Some of the toddlers got to play with the food in their high chairs whereas others sat at a table. When presenting each substance, the researchers named it using a made-up word, such as dax or kiv. After allowing the child a minute to explore the substance, the researchers showed them the same food in a different container and asked them to say its "name" (i.e., the made-up word). Children tested in the highchair demonstrated better recall of the names of the substances. Their results support the view that toddlers' learning of words is contextually bound; that is, toddlers benefit from learning new words for substances in a context that they already associate with food.

== Representative publications ==
- Horst, J. S., & Samuelson, L. K. (2008). Fast mapping but poor retention by 24-month-old infants. Infancy, 13(2), pages 128–157.
- Samuelson, L., & Smith, L. B. (2000). Grounding development in cognitive processes. Child Development, 71(1), pages 98–106.
- Samuelson, L. K., Smith, L. B., Perry, L. K., & Spencer, J. P. (2011). Grounding word learning in space. PLOS One, 6(12), e28095.
- Smith, L. B., Jones, S. S., Landau, B., Gershkoff-Stowe, L., & Samuelson, L. (2002). Object name learning provides on-the-job training for attention. Psychological Science, 13(1), pages 13–19.
- Spencer, J. P., Blumberg, M. S., McMurray, B., Robinson, S. R., Samuelson, L. K., & Tomblin, J. B. (2009). Short arms and talking eggs: Why we should no longer abide the nativist–empiricist debate. Child Development Perspectives, 3(2), pages 79–87.
- Spencer, J. P., Perone, S., Smith, L. B., & Samuelson, L. K. (2011). Learning words in space and time: Probing the mechanisms behind the suspicious-coincidence effect. Psychological Science, 22(8), pages 1049–1057.
