= Make believe =

Children's game

Make believe, also known as pretend play or imaginative play, is a loosely structured form of play that generally includes role-play, object substitution and nonliteral behavior. What separates play from other daily activities is its fun and creative aspect rather than being an action performed for the sake of survival or necessity. Children engage in make believe for a number of reasons. It provides the child with a safe setting to express fears and desires. When children participate in pretend play, they are integrating and strengthening previously acquired knowledge. Children who have better pretense and fantasy abilities also show better social competence, cognitive capabilities, and an ability to take the perspective of others. In order for the activity to be referred to as pretend play, the individual must be intentionally diverting from reality. The individual must be aware of the contrast between the real situation and the make believe situation. If the child believes that the make believe situation is reality, then they are misinterpreting the situation rather than pretending. Pretend may or may not include action, depending on whether the child chooses to project their imagination onto reality or not.

== History ==
The interest in pretend play advanced through three significant stages, though it has likely existed since the dawn of humanity, as children tend to do this naturally on their own, without coercion, or needing a term to describe what they are doing. The initial stage was during the 1920s and 1930s when research in play had gained popularity. During this time, there were little or no empirical findings specifically about pretend play. A revival of interest starting in the late 1940s signified the second stage. The new mission was to find how pretend play related to the developing personality of a child. A common hypothesis during this period was that pretend behavior projected a child's inner feelings and reflected their experiences in their everyday lives. The most recent stage, which persists until today, began in the 1970s. Research in this stage is greatly influenced by Jean Piaget's studies and theories, either in terms of finding evidence to support it or to falsify it. Despite the cultural jargon on the issue, the history of playing make believe may indeed have originated at the dawn on consciousness, itself.

== Critical period ==
The act of pretending is believed to be inbuilt because it occurs universally and begins promptly between the ages of 18 and 24 months (Lillard, Pinkham & Smith, 2011) . The prevalence and frequency of pretense increases between 1 and a half to 2 1/2 years of age. The first stage of pretense generally starts with object substitution. By 3 years, a child can easily distinguish between real life events and pretense. Children within 3 to 6 years, who have acclimated to pretend play, show an increase in interactive pretend play. This means that they participate in self-other relations, giving the doll a more active role (e.g., driving a car) instead of a passive recipient role (e.g., being fed). At the age of three, children's pretense remains close to their real life experiences. A three-year-old girl may pretend that she and her mother are going grocery shopping. In this case, both her role in the relationship and the activity she is taking part in are literal. There is then an increase in the mastery of role play within the ages of 4 and 5 years. During the fifth year, the child shows ability to incorporate forms of relationships into their play. They are no longer limited to the role of child, instead, they can be a parent or a spouse, or expand further by adopting the role of members in society such as policemen, doctors and so forth.

== Components ==
=== Role-play ===
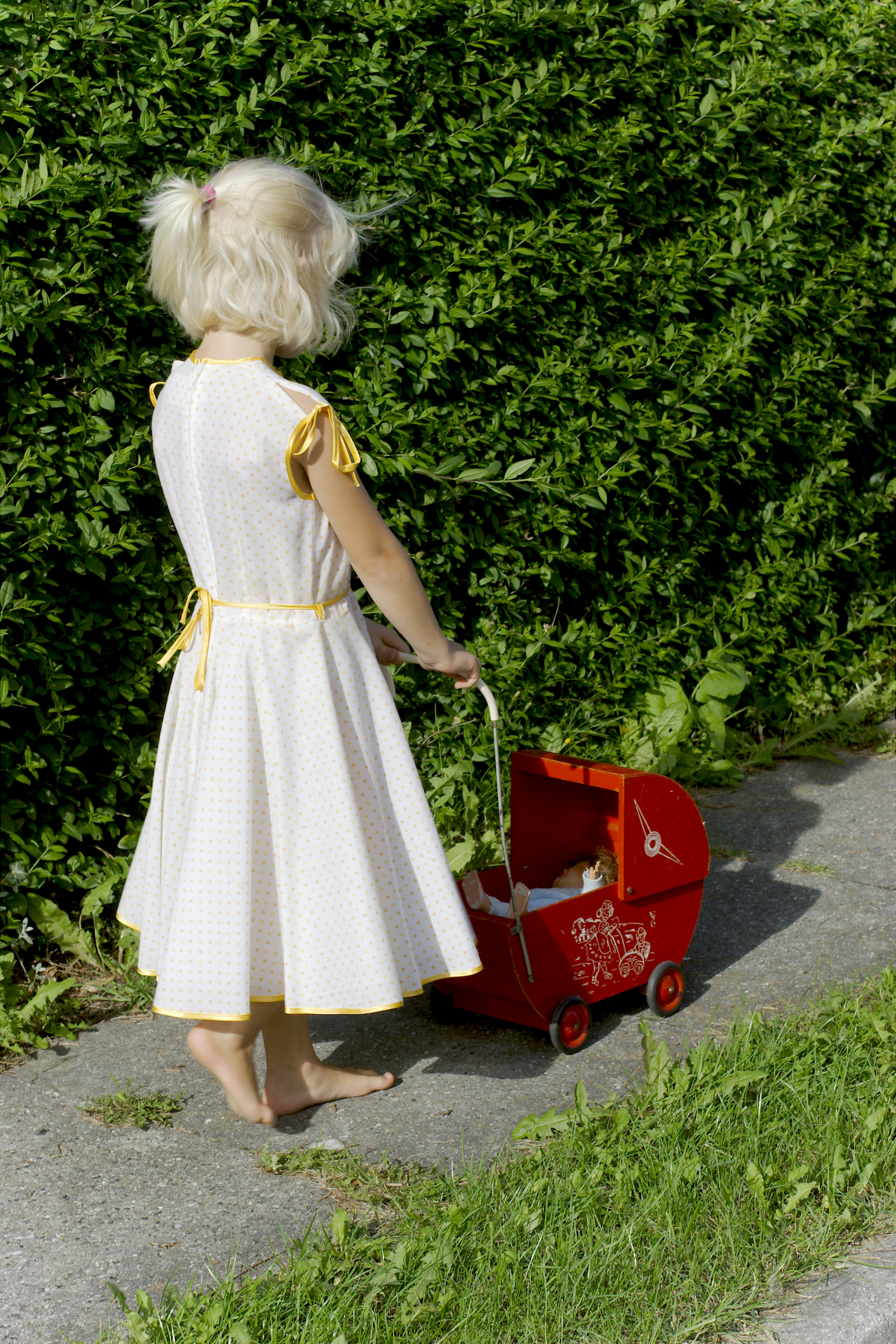
Girl pretending to take a stroll with a doll.

When children participate in social role enactment, or role-play, they are portraying the identity or certain traits of another individual. This includes representing both external and internal qualities. When a child role-plays alongside one or more other individuals, they are engaging in an activity called sociodramatic play. Sociodramatic play emerges at around three years, and sometimes earlier for children who have older siblings. During its early stage, it follows a very strict script, sticks closely to existing roles and includes more parallel play than interactive play. By the age of 5, children begin to deviate from the strict roles and scripts. They start to integrate more imagination into their roles and build off of their partner's creations.

Role play exists in three forms. Relational role-play, usually the first to emerge, is based on relationships that the child observes or experiences. Such relationships include mother and child, father and child, husband and wife, etc. Functional role-play emphasizes on the jobs and actions that the character usually performs. Character role play portrays the character's stereotypical features usually determined by society's representation of them.

Pretend play allows for children in low socio-economic backgrounds not to miss out on important developmental milestones, as all a child needs to pretend is their own imagination. Skills that would otherwise require being fostered by educational toys may be developed through pretend play since it is not limited by the child's financial background.

Complex forms of role-play involve the ability of the child to represent another individual's mental representation. This skill appears when a child is around 5 years of age. This strengthens the child's social ability by allowing him/her to take another individual's perspective and can therefore understand and cooperate with others.

=== Nonliteral actions ===
Five recurring behaviors in pretend play that indicate its nonliteral aspect will be explained. The first behavior is the tendency of performing a task without the presence of a necessary instrument, such as pretending to make a call without using an actual phone. The second behavior is substitution, in that the child might use a block rather than a telephone to make a phone call. The third behavior, discussed in the section above, is when a child takes the role of another individual and performs their usual actions, such as pretending to be a firefighter and extinguishing a fire. The fourth behavior is when a certain action results in an unrealistic outcome, such as a child pretending to clean the room by simply snapping a finger. The fifth behavior will be discussed in depth in the following section and it involves giving an inanimate object, such as a doll, animate qualities, such as talking and drinking tea.

It is important for a child to always understand that pretense is isolated from the real world. This means that the child must understand the nonliteral aspect of pretend play and understand that the changes made during pretend play are temporary. Children must be aware that once the play session ends, the nonliteral aspects of pretend play such as role taking and substituted objects also cease to exist. One form of pretend play widely observed in children is the creation of imaginary companions. Imaginary companions can be entirely in the child's imagination or they can be based on a doll or stuffed toy that portrays animate qualities. About one to two-thirds of children under 7 years of age have an imaginary companion that later diminishes as the child ages. The significance of this form of pretend play has not yet been determined; however, there have been some speculations that it supports children's fledgling social skills.

=== Toys and props ===
In a study by Welsch, children provided with props showed sophisticated levels of play. In pretend play, any object in the child's surroundings can be used as a prop.

==== Substitution ====
Any object can be integrated into pretend play as a representation of another object. This kind of representation is referred to as substitution. The ability to substitute one object for another emerges when a child is about 2 years old. In early instances of substitution, children are only capable of substituting objects that either have a similar structure or a similar function. For example, a child can pretend that a pen is a toothbrush, or that a television remote is a telephone. A pen has roughly the same shape as a toothbrush, while the remote has buttons that function similarly to a telephone. Around the age of 3, the child begins to master substitution and no longer needs physical or functional similarity between the actual object and the substitute. The child also becomes capable of substitution without the use of a concrete object, thus depending solely on imagination (e.g. putting their palm to their ear and having a conversation, indicating a phone call). The ability to hold more than one substitution at a time also increases, meaning that the child can pretend to be on the phone, walking a dog, and sipping juice all at once.

There are two types of substitutions. Symbolic substitution is when one object is used to represent another, such as when a coach uses sticks to represent players in a game plan. Hypothetical substitution is when one object is used "as-if" it actually is another object, such as the previous example of imagining that a pen functions as a toothbrush.

==== Doll play ====
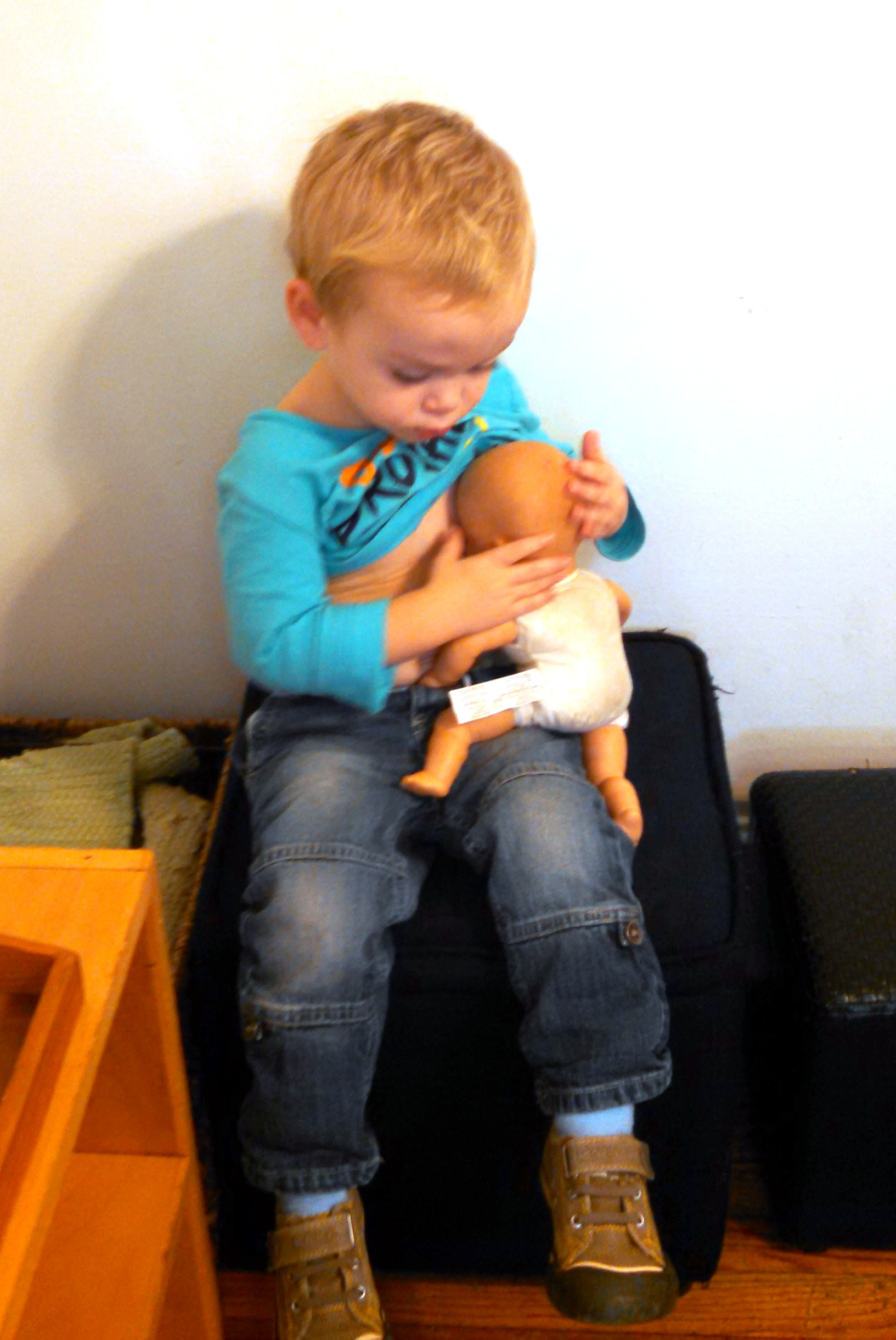
A boy pretending to nurse his doll.

Pretense with dolls begins when a child extends pretend self actions to a doll. A child might start by pretending to feed themselves, then reach out and pretend to be feeding a doll. This is further developed when a child begins giving the doll an active role rather than a passive one. For example, the doll does not just eat when fed by the child, instead, the child pretends that the doll reaches for the spoon and feeds itself. After the doll is given an active role, the child begins to bestow upon it sensory and emotional attributes, such as feeling sad, happy, or hurt. The highest form of doll play appears when a child is about 3 1/2 years of age. At this point, the child is capable of giving the doll cognitive abilities.

A distinguishing feature between doll play and social play, which includes more than one child, is the degree of control a child has. When participating in doll play, the child has full control over the situation.

== Influencing factors ==
Pretend play is universal, in that it appears in many or all cultures. However, some cultures tend to disapprove it and believe that it is a form of communication with spirits or devils. These different views tend to impact the amount of time dedicated to pretend play and the themes that children interact with. Yet, although many cultures discourage pretend play, its unavoidable emergence indicates that it develops from internal cognitive abilities rather than from the external environment or observed learning.

=== Adult intervention ===
==== Gender roles ====
Sex-typed play is generally established between the ages of 4 and 9 years. During this age, girls often take domestic and realistic roles, while boys often lean more towards fantastical and physically active roles. The degree to which these roles are expressed has been linked to the attitudes of the parents. Children of parents who encourage sex roles and disapprove cross-sex references show more instances of sex-typed play. Although the parents' attitudes are the most influential, other adult role models such as teachers and family members can also reinforce gender play.

==== Family structure ====
Levels of imagination are closely related to a child's familial environment. Issues such as marital conflict and physical forms of discipline create anxiety and tension in the child's life. These have been linked to reduced occurrence of play behaviors and low levels of imagination.

On the other hand, strong and encouraging relationships between the children and their parents, specifically fathers, are linked to higher rates of play and imaginative pretense. When parents introduce pretend play to their children at an early age, the children begin to imitate their actions and create their own pretense scenarios. Children also become more capable of identifying social signals, such as eye contact and referential pointing.

=== Scripts ===
Participants in games of make believe may draw upon many sources for inspiration. Welsch describes book-related pretend play, wherein children draw upon texts to initiate games. Children seem most interested in texts with, for example, significant levels of tension. Children who use more fantastical pretense themes tend to understand the concept of pretense at an earlier stage. Although stories and acting inspire creativity in pretend play, long durations of television exposure has been associated with lower levels of imagination.

== Social and cognitive development ==
The presence of a relationship between pretend play and the following cognitive and social skills suggests that pretend play may have a causal effect. Current research attempts to investigate how pretend play can be used to develop and improve performances in theory of mind tasks, reasoning skills, and how it can be used as an intervention method, especially for children with autism. Most research emphasizes on the preschool period since this age group shows the greatest emergence and development in pretend play and the following social and cognitive skills. Research on preschool children also seek to integrate pretend play as a teaching method.

=== Theory of mind ===
Pretend play encompasses several abilities that coincide with theory of mind. The first two abilities relate to object representation. The child has the ability to mentally represent one object as another. The child also has the ability to understand the paradox, in which the object can represent another, but in essence remains the same object. This means that the child is required to hold two contradicting mental representations of the same object. In 3 year olds, this cognitive ability is evident in pretend play but not in other activities. For example, the child can pretend that a pen is a toothbrush, but when shown an apple-shaped soap bar, the child is unable to comprehend the real and apparent features of the object. This inability is referred to as mutual exclusivity bias. However, development of pretend play has been found to correlate with performances in the previous example along with performances in the false-belief task, which also tests a child's understanding of mental representations. Children begin to pass the false belief task at around the age of 4.

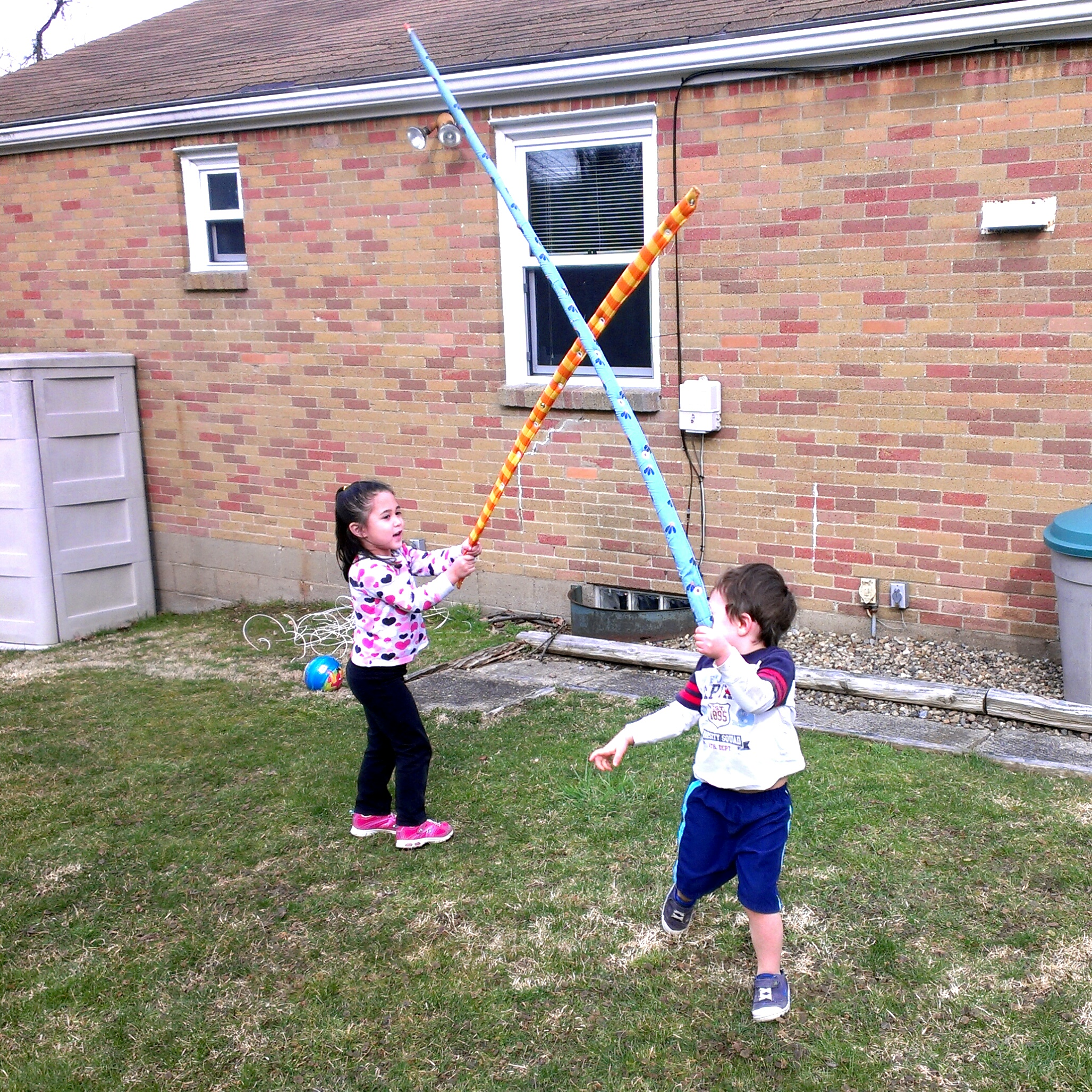
Children pretend to play at lightsaber combat.

The third ability is related to social representation, in which the child is able to represent another individual's mental representations, such as desires, thoughts, and feelings. This ability appears when a child is about 5 years old. It enables the child to take the perspective of others and strengthens their understanding of others' thoughts and beliefs. By this age, children are aware of the subjectivity of pretense. The ability of perspective taking is also central in an individual's ability to cooperate and work with others. This is a complex representation skill because it requires the child to have a representation of a representation. The child also needs to keep in mind that the representation they are holding is not their own. When a child engages in role play, they are engaging in simulation in which they are putting themselves in the character's mental state.

Another ability, joint attention, is related to social referencing. Both theory of mind and pretense require a certain degree of interacting and communicating with others. Joint attention includes the ability to follow another individual's referential pointing, eye gaze, or view point. When children participate in pretend play with other individuals they are required to share the same pretend presuppositions of the object and situation as the other individual. For example, when pretending to take a road trip, both children are expected to know that the chairs they sit on represent car seats. Children show more instances of joint attention in pretend play than they do in other non-symbolic play activities.

=== Counterfactual reasoning ===
Counterfactual thinking is the ability to conceptualize alternative outcomes to the same situation. Studies support that children between 4 and 6 years of age are better capable of conceptualizing alternative outcomes when the situation is unrealistic or is set in a pretend context. Children also perform better when the situation presented is open ended. When the situation already has an outcome, the child finds it difficult to conceptualize an alternative. A similar factor between counterfactual reasoning and pretend play is that they both deal with situations that divert from actual events.

=== Autism spectrum disorder ===
Individuals with autism exhibit large delays in pretend play. This delay correlates with their inability to pass false belief tasks at 4 years of age. Another delay found in children with autism is language delay. This language delay has been associated with pretend play, such that children with autism who engage in pretend play have more advanced language skills.

=== Executive function ===
Executive function refers to a specific set of cognitive operations that encompasses inhibitory control, working memory, and cognitive flexibility. Inhibitory control has been particularly associated with pretend play, especially during play that involves substitution of objects such as pretending a stick is a sword. Usually the child's ability to inhibit the real identity of an object in order to treat it with its pretend identity varies with age and what attributes the child needs to ignore, form and/or function. Overall, prior research has shown that pretend play activities can improve a child's executive function, but whether the act of pretending or some other part of the activity such as practice inventing a story or building a fortress is responsible is still an open question.

== Learning and knowledge acquisition ==
Pretend play is not only associated with developing general cognitive abilities and reinforcing existing knowledge, but recent research has been investigating how children learn new knowledge during pretend play. While children do not invent new knowledge on their own, when pretending with others, children make judgements about the generalizability of unknown information introduced by others in the pretend context. These judgements affect the degree to which children believe the information is applicable and reflective of the real world. There are a number of factors known to influence these judgements including the fantastical themes employed in the pretend world as well as the credibility of the other play participants.

=== Emotions ===
By the age of three, children are generally able to distinguish fantasy and pretense from reality, but there are a number of reasons why children might confuse the two. In some cases, it appears as though children are unable to regulate their emotions, especially fear, and this leads to what may seem like confusion between reality and pretense, such as monsters hiding in their toy bin. Negative emotions such as fear and anger also seem to have a negative effect on children's tendency to believe an event is either possibly real or fantasy and either more or less likely to actually happen in reality.

=== Prior knowledge ===
From ages as early as 15 months, children demonstrate both an understanding of pretense and expectations of reality being reflected in pretense. At times, pretend play may involve animals, objects, or places that the child knows little or nothing about, and any information about these subjects that is introduced during the pretend play is readily associated with the subject. However, when the child has some knowledge about the subject of pretense, like being familiar with the behavior of lions, and new information is introduced that is contrary to their knowledge, such as lions only eat animal crackers, they are less likely to learn this information as being generally true of lions outside of the pretend play context and may even be resistant to the premise in pretense as well. In fact, the extent to which a pretend context is more or less connected to reality, such as how realistic the task is or whether the characters are people the child may encounter, influences how likely the child is to learn generalizations from the pretend play.

=== Credibility and trust ===
Children do not treat all new information equally, and in fact a number of situational and source specific factors influence how likely children are to believe information is true or applicable to reality as is the case in pretend play. Jaswal (2010) found that when playing with an adult, children display a general tendency to trust the truthfulness of information, though the extent to which it conflicts with what they already know or believe will still influence the extent they will generalize the information to reality. However, over multiple sessions playing with a person, how reliable or accurate information from that person has been in the past will have a proportional influence on how likely the child will believe new information. Also other attributes the adult or peer may influence the child's judgements. Children have been shown to be sensitive to socio-economic cues and differences. Children also look at the informant's stance relative to a perceived group, whether that be the group involved in play or a larger social group that the child identifies with, and will show a bias towards information coming from a less conflicting stance with the majority. Overall children, while biased to trust adults, still apply rational judgements to new information introduced during pretend play that influences their tendency to believe how much that information generalizes to reality.

== See also ==
- Early childhood education
- Early childhood intervention
- Early childhood
- Metarepresentation
- Mutual exclusivity (psychology)
- Play (activity)
- Play therapy
- Storytelling game
