= Semantic mapping =

Semantic mapping can refer to:

- Semantic matching, in computer science, a matching to exchange information in a semantically sound manner, because of the semantic heterogeneity
- Semantic mapping (statistics), a dimensionality reduction method in statistics
- Semantic mapping (literacy), a technique in which graphical models are used to help school students learn vocabulary
- Semantic mapping, the transformation of data elements from one namespace into another namespace on the Semantic Web, performed by a semantic mapper
