= Susan Carey =

American psychologist

- Born: 1942 (age 83–84)
- Education: Radcliffe College (BA); Harvard University (PhD)
- Known for: Conceptual development; Language development
- Scientific career
- Fields: Developmental psychology; Cognitive development
- Workplaces: Harvard University; New York University; Massachusetts Institute of Technology
- Thesis: Is the child a scientist with false theories about the world? (1971)

Susan E. Carey (born 1942) is an American psychologist who is a professor of psychology at Harvard University. She studies language acquisition, children's development of concepts, conceptual changes over time, and the importance of executive functions. She has conducted experiments on infants, toddlers, adults, and non-human primates. Her books include Conceptual Change in Childhood (1985) and The Origin of Concepts (2009).

Among the ideas that Carey has developed are fast mapping, whereby children learn the meanings of words after a single exposure; extended mapping, folk theories, and Quinian bootstrapping. Her work is considered "the starting point for any serious modern theory of conceptual development."

In 2009, Carey was the first woman to receive the David E. Rumelhart Prize for significant contributions to the theoretical foundation of human cognition. Carey received the 2020 Atkinson Prize in Psychological and Cognitive Sciences for her theory of conceptual change, for which she is credited with having "revolutionized our understanding of how humans construct an understanding of objects, number, living kinds, and the physical world."

== Early life and education ==
Susan Carey was born in 1942 to William N. Carey Jr., a research engineer with the Highway Research Board (HRB), and his first wife, Mary Champine. She attended Ottawa Township High School in Ottawa, Illinois, graduating in 1960.

Susan Carey received her BA from Radcliffe College in 1964. Carey then attended Harvard University. As an undergraduate she did field work with the Tzotzil, a Mayan people in Chiapas. In her junior year she took classes with George Armitage Miller and Jerome Bruner, and worked during the summer as a research assistant with Peter Wason, who was visiting from University College, London. Carey worked with refugees in Tanzania before accepting a Fulbright scholarship in 1965 to work on her M.A. at the University of London. She studied African history at the School of Oriental and African Studies (SOAS) and attended Wason's laboratory meetings in cognitive studies. Carey began graduate work at Harvard in 1967, receiving her PhD in experimental psychology in 1971.

== Career ==
Carey was employed at the Massachusetts Institute of Technology (MIT) from 1972 to 1996 in the Department of Brain and Cognitive Sciences. Carey credits Hans-Lukas Teuber as an important career mentor who helped determine her direction and Jerry Fodor as an intellectual mentor with whom she argued about the possibility of conceptual change. At MIT, Carey worked alongside George Miller, Jerome Bruner, and Roger Brown and first met Elizabeth Spelke. Carey was an assistant professor at MIT from 1972 to 1977, an associate professor from 1977 to 1984, and a full professor from 1984 to 1996. Carey served as president of the Society for Philosophy and Psychology in 1983-1984.

In 1994, Carey was one of 16 women faculty in the School of Science at MIT who drafted and co-signed a letter to the then-Dean of Science (now Chancellor of Berkeley) Robert Birgeneau, which started a campaign to highlight and challenge gender discrimination at MIT.

In 1996, Carey joined New York University, where she was a professor in the department of psychology from 1996 to 2001. In 2001, she joined the faculty at Harvard University. She became the Henry A. Morss Jr. and Elisabeth W. Morss Professor of Psychology at Harvard as of 2004, the first woman to receive the award.

Carey has served on editorial boards including Cognition, Development Psychology, Memory and Cognition, and Psychological Review.

== Research ==
In 1978, Susan Carey and Elsa Bartlett coined the term "fast mapping". This term refers to the hypothesized mental process where a new concept (e.g. a color name) is learned based only on a single exposure. They also discussed "extended mapping", the process by which children gradually brought the new concept into alignment with their previous understanding of a conceptual space. Carey argues that extended mapping requires both the creation of new primitives for words and hypothesis testing about word meanings. Fast mapping has become a central idea in developmental theories about the learning of words leading to "considerable methodological and theoretical advances". Studies of extended mapping are difficult and less often attempted.

In 1985, Carey wrote Conceptual Change in Childhood, a book about the cognitive differences between children and adults. It is a case study about children's acquisition of biological knowledge and analyzes the ways the knowledge is restructured during development. The book reconciles Jean Piaget's work on animism with later work on children's knowledge of biological concepts. Carey suggested that children's early understanding of biological concepts like "animal" indicates anthropomorphic thinking or folk theorization in which humans are expected to be prototypical of non-humans. (Subsequent researchers have argued that such anthropomorphic thinking is not universal, emphasizing the effects of culture and experience.) Carey also compared the ways that knowledge is restructured by children and by adults. She argued that similar psychological processes are involved in conceptual development in children and in the development of theories by scientists as shown through the history of science.

In 2001, Carey and Elizabeth Spelke both moved to Harvard, where they started the Laboratory for Developmental Studies. Working with infants, toddlers, adults, and non-human primates, they developed a core knowledge proposal. According to the idea of core cognition, human infants begin life with a set of fundamental processing mechanisms or core knowledge systems, for dealing with object, agent, number, and possibly causality and space. These early representations provide a basis for further inference, reasoning, and the development of larger conceptual structures.

In 2009, Carey published The Origin of Concepts, "an elegant, well-written, and ambitious synthesis" with the goal of providing a comprehensive explanation of conceptual structure, concept acquisition and change, and cognitive development. In it Carey coined the term "Quinian bootstrapping" for a theory of how people build complex concepts out of simple ones. The book won the Cognitive Development Society Book Award in 2009 and the Eleanor Maccoby Book Award of the American Psychological Association in 2011.

Beginning in 2012, Carey and Deborah Zaitchik have led the Executive Function and Conceptual Change project, to study how people integrate their existing knowledge with new knowledge that requires conceptual change. They have identified executive function as a key factor influencing the process of learning and conceptual change. Executive function includes important mental processes like focusing on information in working memory, inhibiting responses to information, and set-switching between contexts. Children's level of executive function predicts their ability to learn an idea that involves conceptual change, such as the biological concept that something is alive. Children with higher EF scores are more effective at learning. Research also suggests that training can improve executive function and lead to subsequent gains in children's math, reading, and vocabulary scores.

Surprisingly, researchers have shown that elderly adults make errors in reasoning reminiscent of those made by young children. In adults this may reflect failures of executive functioning rather than the absence of relevant concepts. Children under 5, adults with Alzheimer’s disease, and healthy adults between age 65 and 81 displayed similar patterns of miscategorization on certain tasks. When asked to sort things according to whether or not they were alive, members of all three groups tended to categorize things that moved - including airplanes, watches, and bicycles - as "alive". Carey is examining the question of how executive functioning impacts adults' ability to express the knowledge they have previously learned.

== Personal life ==
Carey is married to the professor of philosophy Ned Block (NYU).

== Awards and honors ==
- 2020, Atkinson Prize in Psychological and Cognitive Sciences, National Academy of Sciences
- 2014, Mentor Award in Developmental Psychology, American Psychological Association
- 2011, Eleanor Maccoby Book Award, American Psychological Association
- 2009, David E. Rumelhart Prize
- 2009, Distinguished Scientific Contribution Award, American Psychological Association
- 2009, Cognitive Development Society Book Award, Cognitive Development Society, for The origin of concepts
- 2007. Corresponding Fellow (FBA), British Academy
- 2007, Member, American Philosophical Society,
- 2002, Member, United States National Academy of Sciences
- 2002, William James Fellow Award, Association for Psychological Science
- 2001, Member, American Academy of Arts and Sciences
- 1999, Guggenheim Fellowship
- 1998, Jean Nicod Prize for philosophy of mind, Institut Jean Nicod (IJN)
- 1998, George A Miller Lecture, Society of Cognitive Neuroscience
- 1995-1996, James McKeen Cattell Fund Fellowship
- 1984-1985, Fellow, Center for Advanced Study in the Behavioral Sciences
- 1976-1978, Radcliffe Institute Fellowship

== Books ==
- ——— (1985). Conceptual change in childhood. Cambridge, Mass.: MIT Press. ISBN 0262031108.
- ——— (2009). The origin of concepts. Oxford: Oxford University Press. ISBN 9780195367638.

== Selected papers ==
Papers written as sole author

- ——— (2015). "The science of cognitive science". Social Anthropology. 23 (2): 204–207. doi:10.1111/1469-8676.12119.
- ——— (2014). "On Learning New Primitives in the Language of Thought: Reply to Rey". Mind & Language. 29 (2): 133–166. doi:10.1111/mila.12045.
- ——— (2011). "Concept innateness, concept continuity, and bootstrapping". The Behavioral and Brain Sciences. 34 (3): 152–162. doi:10.1017/s0140525x10003092. PMC 3528179. PMID 23264705.
- ——— (2010). "Beyond Fast Mapping". Language Learning and Development. 6 (3): 184–205. doi:10.1080/15475441.2010.484379. PMC 3101498. PMID 21625404.
- ——— (2009). "Where Our Number Concepts Come From". The Journal of Philosophy. 106 (4): 220–254. doi:10.5840/jphil2009106418. PMC 3489488. PMID 23136450.
- ——— (2008). "Math schemata and the origins of number representations". The Behavioral and Brain Sciences. 31 (6): 645–646. doi:10.1017/s0140525x08005608. PMC 4097143. PMID 25035525.
- ——— (2004). "Bootstrapping and the origins of concepts". Daedalus. 133 (1): 59–68. doi:10.1162/001152604772746701. JSTOR 20027897.
- ——— (2002). "Evidence for numerical abilities in young infants: A fatal flaw?". Developmental Science. 5 (2): 202–205. doi:10.1111/1467-7687.00221_1.
- ——— (2001). "Evolutionary and Ontogenetic Foundations of Arithmetic". Mind & Language. 16 (1). doi:10.1111/1468-0017.00155.
- ——— (2000). "Science Education as Conceptual Change". Journal of Applied Developmental Psychology. 21 (1): 13–19. doi:10.1016/s0193-3973(99)00046-5.
- ——— (2000). "The Origin of Concepts". Journal of Cognition and Development. 1 (1): 37–41. doi:10.1207/S15327647JCD0101N_3. S2CID 8886171.
- ——— (1998). "Knowledge of Number: Its Evolution and Ontogeny". Science. 282 (5389): 641–642. doi:10.1126/science.282.5389.641. PMID 9841416. S2CID 8124842.
- ——— (1997). "Do constraints on word meaning reflect prelinguistic cognitive architecture?". Cognitive Studies. 4 (1): 35–58.
- ——— (1994). "Does learning a language require the child to reconceptualize the world?". Lingua. 92: 143–167. doi:10.1016/0024-3841(94)90340-9.
- ——— (1992-01-29). "Becoming a face expert". Philosophical Transactions of the Royal Society of London, Series B. 335 (1273): 95–103. doi:10.1098/rstb.1992.0012. PMID 1348143.
- ——— (1988). "Conceptual differences between children and adults". Mind & Language. 3 (3): 167–181. doi:10.1111/j.1468-0017.1988.tb00141.x.
- ——— (1986). "Cognitive science and science education". American Psychologist. 41 (10): 1123–1130. doi:10.1037/0003-066x.41.10.1123.
