= Mutual exclusivity (psychology) =

Psychological word learning constraint

Mutual exclusivity is a word learning constraint that involves the tendency to assign one label/name, and in turn avoid assigning a second label, to a single object. Mutual exclusivity is often discussed as one of three main lexical constraints, or word learning biases, that are believed to play major roles in word learning, the other two being the whole-object and taxonomic constraints. This assumption is typically first seen in the early stages of word learning by toddlers, but it is not limited to young childhood. Mutual exclusivity is often discussed by domain-specific accounts of language as limiting children's hypotheses about the possible meanings of words. It is generally accepted that mutual exclusivity alone cannot account for the complexity of word learning but is instead “more like heuristics in problem-solving."

== History ==
Research on mutual exclusivity as a lexical constraint first began in the 1980s. Markman and Wachtel (1988) designed what some consider to be the seminal study of mutual exclusivity. It involved six studies that analyzed children's willingness to assign an unfamiliar label to familiar or unfamiliar objects. In their first study, they placed two objects in front of 3- to 4-year-old children, one that had a label known to the children (familiar object) and one that did not have a known label (novel object). Once shown both objects, the children were then told "show me the [nonsense syllable]" to see which object the children would assign this new label. The children had a significant tendency to "reject a second label for [a familiar] object, treating it, instead, as a label for a novel object." This is often referred to as a simple disambiguation task. In their remaining five studies, they examined whether familiarity to an object would [mediate?] whether or not children would assign a new label to the object as a name for the object itself or a label of a part of it. For example, Study 2 involved a familiar condition and unfamiliar condition. In the familiar condition, children were presented with a familiar object (in this case "fish") and asked whether a novel label ("dorsal fin") applied to the whole object or "just this part" (pointing to the fin). In the unfamiliar condition, children were presented with an unfamiliar object ("lung") and asked whether a novel label ("trachea") applied to the whole object or a part of it. Methods of studies 3-6 were general variations of this design and ultimately found similar results. When the object was familiar to the children, they overwhelmingly assigned the novel part label to a part of the object, rather than the whole object itself. When the object was unfamiliar to the children, they overwhelmingly assigned the novel part label to the whole object itself, rather than one of its parts. These studies set a precedent for how many researchers have studied mutual exclusivity to date.

== Function ==
Merriman and Bowman (1989) offered a list of ways in which mutual exclusivity may influence infants’ word learning. First, mutual exclusivity might influence the infant's decision about the reference of a new word. For example, if a child is faced with a familiar object for which they already have a label, and an unfamiliar object, which they have not yet labeled, they are likely to map a novel word onto the unfamiliar object. This is called the disambiguation effect. Next, the bias might cause an infant to change the extension of a familiar word. In this case, a child might remove 'wolf' from their extension of 'dog' upon hearing an animal labeled a 'wolf.' This can be called the correction effect. As well, the bias might compel an infant to reject a new word, for instance, rejecting 'wolf' in favor of 'dog.' This is the rejection effect. Lastly, mutual exclusivity might influence word generalization. In this case, if a child knows an object to have a particular name, the child should not generalize other names to it. This is known as the restriction effect.

== Associations with vocabulary learning ==
Some studies have found positive correlations between children's use of mutual exclusivity and their learned vocabulary, while others have found the opposite. In Callanan's and Sabbagh's (2004) study on parents’ facilitation of mutual exclusivity with their 12- to 24-month-olds, they found that having parents who gave two labels for an object to their child was positively correlated with having a productive vocabulary. Markman, Wasow, and Hansen (2003) found that “lexical constraints enable babies to learn words even under non-optimal conditions.”

One study (Stevens & Karmiloff-Smith, 1997) examined the use of lexical constraints in word learning in children with Williams syndrome, a rare neurodevelopmental disorder. Although they did not abide by other constraints such as the whole object or taxonomic constraints, they did exhibit fast mapping and mutual exclusivity.

== Age and mutual exclusivity ==
Halberda (2003) was one of the first studies to examine the limiting role of age on children's exhibition of mutual exclusivity. He found a linear relationship between age and performance; that is, the older the child, the more likely they were to use mutual exclusivity in word learning. Grouped by age, 14-, 16-, and 17-month-olds were tested in a preferential looking paradigm in which they were presented with a familiar object and novel object, asked to “look at the dax,” and were recorded based on which object they looked at longest. The 17-month-olds looked at the novel object more than their original baseline preferences. The 16-month-olds looked at rates no higher than chance. The 14-month-olds actually looked at the familiar object (a car) after being asked to find the “dax.”

Other studies have offered different timelines for different areas of development of this constraint in children. Bion, Borovsky, and Fernald (2013) claimed that their findings suggested that “the ability to find the referent of a novel word in ambiguous contexts is a skill that improves from 18 to 30 months of age.” The 18-month-olds in their sample did not reliably look at the novel object after labeling, whereas 24-month-olds did. Liittschwager and Markman (1994) found evidence of 16-month-olds exhibiting mutual exclusivity, suggesting that differences in methods could account for this discrepancy in results across studies. They also found age differences in which children can override mutual exclusivity and give second labels to objects. They presented 16- and 24-month-olds with an object, familiar or unfamiliar, which was given a novel label. It was hypothesized that the children presented with a familiar object would have more trouble accepting the new label than those presented with the unfamiliar object. They found that their hypothesis was correct for the 16-month-olds but not the 24-month-olds. As the researchers put it, the 24-month-olds were able to “override this default assumption” of mutual exclusivity and give a second label to an object. However, they also learned that the 24-month-olds were only able to do this when the information load was low; that is, when they were given multiple objects to learn the labels of, they had similar rates of difficulty in learning the second label as the 16-month-olds. It is well known that adults have less difficulty in overriding the assumption of mutual exclusivity, but this research suggests that this ability to override it may begin as early as age 2.

A number of studies have shown that mutual exclusivity is not a bias exhibited in children alone. Halberda (2006) is one such study which showed that adults also exhibit mutually exclusivity. Specifically, they found that adults systematically avoided assigning the novel label to a known distractor and instead showed a significant looking preference to assigning said label to novel objects. Golinkoff, Hirsh-Pasek, Bailey, and Wenger (1992) also sought to determine whether adults would exhibit mutual exclusivity at similar rates to children. They found that every adult chose the novel object as the referent for the novel term in every trial. The adults’ performance was better than the 2.5-year-olds of their study, who performed slightly worse but still well above chance.

Bialystok and colleagues (2010) found that the younger children in their sample of 3- and 4.5-year-olds showed a higher tendency of exhibiting mutual exclusivity than the older children.

Bion, Borovsky, and Fernald (2013) claimed that their findings suggested that “the ability to find the referent of a novel word in ambiguous contexts is a skill that improves from 18 to 30 months of age.” The 18-month-olds in their sample did not reliably look at the novel object after labeling, whereas 24-month-olds did. The 24-month-olds did not show evidence of having remembered, or retained, the novel label after a waiting period, whereas 30-month-olds showed some signs of retention.

Less research has been conducted specifically on children's and adults’ retention of word-object relations learned through fast mapping. Horst and Samuelson (2008) found that 2-year-olds were able to assign a novel label to a novel object, but after a 5-minute waiting period, the children failed to remember the label. This is consistent with the study done by Bion, Borvesky, and Fernald (2013). In addition to examining 18- and 24-month-olds’ ability to map a new word to a new object, they also tested 24- and 30-month-olds’ retention of the novel labels. They found that 24-month-olds failed to remember the novel labels after a 5-minute waiting period. The 30-month-olds, however, did remember the label.

One study examined 3-year-olds, 4-year-olds, and adults who were given a novel label to a novel object. They were tested three times on whether they successfully mapped the label to the object, once immediately after being presented with the word-object relation, once a week later, and once a month later. They found that the adults were more successful than the 3- and 4-year-olds during the immediate assessment, but all groups performed similarly during the second and third assessments. Furthermore, there was no significant decline in performance by any of the age groups throughout all three assessments. Although not specifically related to mutual exclusivity, this research provides support for the hypothesis that individuals ages 2.5 and up who exhibit mutual exclusivity via fast mapping are able to retain the information they learned for extended periods of time.

== Number of languages learned ==
When tested by a simple disambiguation task, children who learned one language tended to rely on mutual exclusivity more often than children who learned multiple languages. Some evidence suggests that the more languages a child is taught, the less likely they are to exhibit the constraint. Byers-Heinlein and Werker (2009) was one of the first studies to examine the differences between the uses of mutual exclusivity in 17- and 18-month-old monolingual, bilingual, and trilingual children. Their monolingual subjects exhibited mutual exclusivity more often than their bilingual counterparts. Likewise, their bilingual subjects exhibited the constraint more often than their trilingual counterparts, who showed no reliance on mutual exclusivity. The number of languages learned, rather than vocabulary size, was predictive of children's use of the constraint.

Other studies have built upon this research by examining monolingual and bilingual children's use of mutual exclusivity at ages older than 17 months. A 2017 study examined 2- to 4-year-olds and found that the bilingual children tended to rely less on mutual exclusivity than their monolingual counterparts. Bialystok, Barac, Blaye, and Poulin-Dubois (2010) reported a continuation in this trend in 4.5-year-olds, and a 1997 study by Davidson, Jergovic, Imami, and Theodos found similar trends in 6-year-old monolingual and bilingual children.

Au and Glusman (1990) reported that the monolingual and bilingual children in their study knew enough about language to accept two names for the same object if the labels were from different languages. The separation in their use of mutual exclusivity appeared to occur when the two labels were from the same language.

These studies used a disambiguation task in which the children were presented with a familiar and unfamiliar object and asked to assign a novel label to one or the other. Another line of research using different methodology has yielded different results in monolingual, bilingual, and trilingual children's use of mutual exclusivity. Yow and colleagues (2017) examined 4.5-year-olds’ use of the constraint, but they did not simply present the children with novel objects and labels or teach them the word-object association. Instead, the experimenters looked at the novel object when saying the novel label, so the children needed to use the speaker's gaze to exhibit mutual exclusivity. The bilingual and trilingual children in this study did significantly better in the mutual exclusivity task than the monolingual children. The researchers suspected that this “bilingual advantage” was a result of their increased sensitivity to communicative contexts compared to monolingual children. Results from this study and others have challenged the way researchers understand the mechanisms involved with mutual exclusivity and the way the constraint is operationalized in research designs.

== Mutual exclusivity and animals ==
Evidence suggests that mutual exclusivity is not solely a human bias. Kaminski, Call, and Fischer (2004) tested a dog's ability to fast map new names to new objects. Rico, a border collie, reliably knew over 200 names for over 200 toys. Researchers placed 7 familiar toys and 1 novel toy in a room, and Rico was asked to the room and retrieve some. When told to retrieve the new toy, which was referred to with an unfamiliar label, Rico brought the novel toy to the researcher 7 out of 10 sessions. Four weeks later, they tested his retention of the relation between the novel toy and name. They placed one of the unfamiliar toys that Rico successfully mapped in the original sessions in a room with four familiar toys and four novel toys. When asked to retrieve these target toys based on their original novel label, Rico successfully retrieved them in 3 out of 6 sessions. The researchers of this study noted that this retention is comparable to the performance of 3-year-olds.

== Caregivers’ facilitation of mutual exclusivity ==
One study found that parents reliably facilitate the use of mutual exclusivity in their children. In two studies, 12- to 24-month old children and their parents were recorded while doing free play. In both studies, parents reliably preferred to give their children only one label for an object rather than two. When they did offer two, they often also gave clarifying information to explain why two labels were appropriate.

== Criticisms and opposing perspectives ==
There exist several criticisms of mutual exclusivity.

Some theorists believe that children possess this bias from the start of word learning, whereas others argue that it is slowly acquired throughout early childhood.

Diesendruck and Markson (2001) argued that children's avoidance of lexical overlap may actually be caused by the way researchers speak to them. In one of their studies, they found that children interpret speakers’ requests based on shared knowledge between them. In other words, speakers’ communicative intentions help clue children in on what the speaker wants them to say.

Some researchers argue that examples of children learning second labels for objects, which violates the assumption of mutual exclusivity, is a telling sign that mutual exclusivity is not a significant constraint. Others have argued that documented use of mutual exclusivity being mostly exhibited by older children lessens the scope of the assumption.

Liittschwager and Markman (1994) responded to these criticisms by arguing that mutual exclusivity assumes that it is more difficult to learn second labels for objects than first labels, not that learning second labels is an impossible feat. When they tested this, they found that the amount of information given to the children impacted their ability to learn second words for objects. When 2-year-olds only had one word to learn, they learned second labels as easily as first labels. However, when given an additional word to learn, 2-year-olds had more difficulty learning second labels for objects, but not first labels.

McMurray, Horst, and Samuelson (2012) offered an alternative assumption in researching lexical constraints and biases. Rather than accepting the assumption that determining the referent of a novel word is isomorphic to learning, they argue in favor of the assumption of understanding referent selection as an online process that is independent of long-term learning.

Some researchers have criticized the indirect role of mutual exclusivity in word learning because an alternative explanation could account for children's motivation to assign novel labels to novel objects. They may simply be motivated to fill the lexical gap created by a novel object rather than avoiding second labels. In other words, children may be motivated to give a name to objects that they do not already have a name for.

Markman, Wasow, and Hansen (2003) sought to address this criticism by eliminating the use of a novel object in their design. In Study 1, the researchers placed a familiar object (a bottle, for example) next to a bucket and asked some children to search for an object using a familiar label ("find the bottle") or a novel label ("find the press"). In Study 2, they used the same procedures except the familiar object was in the children's hands rather than near the bucket, and in Study 3, they removed the bucket entirely. Because the mutual exclusivity constraint assumes that children will be less willing to accept a second label for an object, the researchers hypothesized that children who were told to search for the press would spend more time searching than those who were asked to find the bottle. They found support for their hypothesis; in general, children in the Novel Label condition spent significantly more time searching than the other children. The researchers concluded that children are motivated to avoid assigning multiple labels to an object, thus supporting mutual exclusivity and eliminating the alternative explanation that filling lexical gaps is their primary motivator.
