= Ellen Markman =

American psychologist and academic

Ellen Markman is an American cognitive scientist, IBM Provostial Professor of Psychology at Stanford University. She specializes in word learning and language development in children, focusing specifically on how children come to associate words with their meanings. Markman's research has also included early work on children's comprehension monitoring and has challenged traditional theories of word learning.

Markman's contribution to cognitive and developmental psychology has had significant impact in the field and has been recognized by awards such as the American Psychological Society's William James Fellow Award for Lifetime Achievement in Basic Research and the American Psychological Association’s Division 7 Outstanding Mentoring Award. She was elected to the American Academy of Arts and Sciences in 2003 and the National Academy of Sciences in 2011.

== Education and career ==
Markman received a Ph.D. from the University of Pennsylvania in 1973. Before becoming a professor at Stanford, Markman was teaching at the University of Illinois. She has been employed as a tenure-track faculty member in the Department of Psychology since 1975, for which she served as Chair from 1994-1997. Markman currently serves as Senior Associate Dean of the Social Sciences of the School of Humanities and Social Sciences. She has also served as Stanford's faculty representative to the NCAA and the Pacific-10 Conference.

Markman's research contends that in order to learn the meaning of a word, children make use of three basic principles: the whole object assumption (words refer to an object rather than to its parts or features), the taxonomic assumption (labels should be extended to an object of the same kind rather than an object that is thematically related), and the mutual exclusivity assumption (another label can be used to refer to a feature or part of an object). Related topics that Markman has studied include categorization and inductive reasoning in children and infants. Markman subscribes to the innatist school of developmental psychologists, which asserts that children possess innate knowledge that they draw upon in the process of language acquisition.

== Book ==
Categorization and Naming in Children: Problems of Induction, MIT Press (1989)
