= Semantic mapping (literacy) =

Semantic mapping or semantic webbing, in literacy, is a method of teaching reading using graphical representations of concepts and the relationships between them.

== See also ==
- Vocabulary development
