= Word learning biases =

Process in early language acquisition

Word learning biases are certain biases or assumptions that allow children to quickly rule out unlikely alternatives in order to effectively process and learn word meanings. They begin to manifest themselves around 18 months, when children begin to rapidly expand their vocabulary. These biases are important for children with limited processing abilities if they are to be successful in word learning. The guiding lexical principles have been defined as implicit and explicit strategies towards language acquisition. When a child learns a new word they must decide whether the word refers to the whole object, part of the object, or the object's characteristics, solving an indeterminacy problem.

== Whole object assumption ==
One way in which children constrain the meaning of novel words is through the whole object assumption. When an adult points to an object and says a word, a child assumes this word labels the entire object, not parts or characteristics of the object. For example, if a child is shown an object and given the label "truck", the child will assume "truck" refers to the entire object instead of the tires, doors, color or other parts. Ellen Markman pioneered work in this field. Her studies suggest that even in cases where color or a dynamic activity is made salient to children, they will still interpret the new word as a label for whole objects.

According to cognitive psychologist Elizabeth Spelke, infants' perception of the physical world is guided by three constraints on the behavior of physical objects: objects must move as wholes, objects move independently of each other, and objects move on connected paths. These three constraints help guide children's interpretations of scenes, and, in turn, explains how the whole object bias reflects the non-linguistic status of objects.

=== Domain specificity ===
It is unclear if the word-learning constraints are specific to the domain of language, or if they apply to other cognitive domains. Evidence suggests that the whole object assumption is a result of an object's tangibility; children assume a label refers to a whole object because the object is more salient than its properties or functions. The whole object assumption may reflect non-linguistic levels of an object and exploits the cognitive tendency to analyze the world through a whole object lens, meaning the whole object assumption can be applied to cognitive domains outside of language.

=== Criticisms ===
One criticism of the whole object assumption is that much of the evidence provided is only for children 18 months and older. A more recent study strengthened the breadth of ages and stimuli conditions under which this bias occurs. As early as 12 months, infants can associate words with whole objects when the objects can be viewed as two separate objects and even when one of the parts is made salient. Another criticism is the claim that a limited set of stimuli has been used that possibly favors a "whole" interpretation. To address this criticism, the whole object assumption has also been tested with adults. Even when participants between the ages of 18–36 were instructed that they would be tested more frequently for parts, they were better able to recognize the whole objects rather than parts. These findings support the hypothesis that there is a tendency to encode the overall shape of the stimuli in working memory, rather than individual details.

== Taxonomic assumption ==
After a child constrains a novel word to label a whole object, the child must learn how to apply the label to similar objects. Ordinarily, children focus on thematic relations between objects when categorizing. For example, if given soup, children will group it together with a bowl and a spoon. Those items would be thematically related. However, when children are given a new label they shift their attention to taxonomic relationships. What this means for the previous example is instead of soup being related to a bowl or spoon, children relate it to ice cream or pudding. The new label is assumed to refer to other objects within the same taxonomic category.

The exact nature of taxonomic assumption is unclear. Baldwin finds that shape is the primary influence of children's expectations towards novel objects. Children draw from a wide variety of characteristics to make inferences, although shape is typically the most prevalent.

Ellen Markman's early studies showed this constraint at work. When two- and three-year-olds were presented with two basic-level objects, two different kinds of dogs, and a third thematically related object, dog food, they showed a tendency to select a dog and dog food; however, if one of the dogs was labeled with an unfamiliar word, the children were more likely to select the two dogs. Another study conducted by Backscheider & Markman attempted to clarify whether this assumption was powerful enough to overcome the preference for thematic relations when objects are engaged in dynamic thematic relations at the time of labeling. A doll was repeatedly seated in a chair when the child either heard "see the bif" or "see this". The label, "bif", caused children to pick objects of the same kind, whereas, the absence of the label caused them to organize objects to the thematic event they had witnessed. Children use this assumption as early as 18 months of age.

Similar to the taxonomic constraint researchers have looked into the principle of categorical scope, which also follows the assumption that children will believe new object labels refer to objects within taxonomic categories. An example of categorical scope and perceptual similarity can be illustrated when children learn animal names. Studies show that children think the identity of an animal only changes if its internal properties change. Children extended labels to two perceptually similar animals more often than when they were dissimilar.

=== Domain specificity ===
The taxonomic assumption is very clearly applicable to cognitive domains outside of language. One obvious domain is children's inductive reasoning. An example of this assumption at work in this domain would be for a child to know that Edgar is a grandfather, and Edgar is bald, so they assume all grandfathers are bald. While there are domains that taxonomic assumptions are seen, there are also clear cognitive domains where these assumptions are avoided, such as identifying causality or classical conditioning. Identifying causality obviously does not utilize the taxonomic assumption. For example, learning that you are allergic to dogs means you realize being around dogs causes your allergies to flare up. However, you do not relate this causality to taxonomic associations and claim that you are also allergic to cats. Another domain where taxonomic associations are not made is in classical conditioning. The popular example is Pavlov's dog. The dog learns to associate the bell with salivating after the dog has associated the bell with food. While these things are thematically related, they are not considered to be associated in a taxonomic fashion.

=== Criticisms ===
There aren't as many criticisms on the taxonomic assumption as there are for other word learning assumptions. However, Nelson (1988) argues against the taxonomic assumption because children aren't responding to tests 100% accurately 100% of the time. The concept of have perfect accuracy every time with every participant isn't something found in most research, but Nelson claims this assumption might not be biological.

Another critique of the taxonomic assumption is that it extends past words thus should not be considered a word learning bias. In 1990, Premack conducted a taxonomic assumption experiment with chimpanzees who were being taught words and those who were not. Premack found similar results of what studies using children found—chimpanzees learning language used the taxonomic assumption. Premack claimed these chimps did not have an idea of real words since they were in the beginning of the word learning process thus making the assumption a nonlinguistic assumption. Others criticize Premack by saying this assumption can fit language but doesn't stop at language which is where the domain specificity comes in.

== Mutual exclusivity assumption ==
The whole object assumption leads children to constraining labels to an entire object, but children must also learn labels for characteristics or parts of an object. To override the whole object assumption, children also utilize the mutual exclusivity assumption. Simply put, the mutual exclusivity assumption suggests that every object only has one name. Children resist assigning a label to an object for which they already have a name or at least will not learn the new name as easily. Children are then able to start considering other possibilities for the new label, for instance, a part of the object. For example, an adult presents a child with two objects, a truck and a novel object. The adult asks the child to pick up the blicket. If the child already knows "truck" but has not heard "blicket" as a label for an object, the child will assume this label maps onto the novel object.

Markman and Wachtel's 1988 studies demonstrated the learning process through the whole-object and mutual exclusivity assumption. The experimenter told three-year-old children a word and then showed them a picture. She asked whether the label referred to the whole object or a part and outlined each option with her finger. When the whole object was unfamiliar they pointed to the part in only 20% of the trials, but pointed to the part in 57% of the trials when the object was familiar. A recent study attempted to replicate and extend these results. Hansen and Markman taught children a new word for a part of a real object by saying the word and tracing the object's contours. (These gestures were meant to remain as naturalistic as possible). They then asked children to point to the new part in order to identify if they have linked the new name to the intended part. The main manipulation was whether the object was familiar or not. Upholding the mutual exclusivity assumption children pointed to the intended part more often in the familiar object condition. Furthermore, the gesture of pointing/outlining the part itself was insufficient for children to learn the part name. Mutual exclusivity and a gesture were necessary for children to select the novel part.

Other researchers have come up with similar principles. Clark's contrast theory holds that "every two forms contrast in meaning". When a new word is presented the child assumes it refers to something that does not yet have a label, but contrast does not take into account the overlap words may have in meaning. Golinkoff's novel name-nameless category (N3C) also states that a child will map a new name to the unnamed object when a named object is present. Unlike contrast, N3C does not require children to understand synonymy, and unlike mutual exclusivity it does not hold that objects have only one name. Furthermore, this principle is not one of the first assumptions child learn mainly because, at this point, children are not dependent on an explicit link between the new word and the object (i.e. by pointing). By acquiring this principle the indirect link of seeing an unnamed object while hearing a new word is enough for the child to map the new label to the unnamed object.

=== Domain specificity ===
Unlike the other two constraints, mutual exclusivity is easily identified as domain-general. The mutual exclusivity assumption is one of the three constraints that is easily generalized to other cognitive domains. Within the domain of language but outside of word-learning, mutual exclusivity is applied to the one-to-one mapping principle of language acquisition as well as the acquisition of syntax. While it is commonly applied throughout the domain of language, mutual exclusivity seems to be a domain-general principle used in analyzing many new domains of knowledge.

=== Criticisms ===
The mutual exclusivity assumption is disputed when children learn objects can have more than one name. For example, a dog can be a "dog" and an "animal" and named "Spot." According to the mutual exclusivity assumption, one would assume children would not accept that the dog could be three different names. However, children tend to accept the differences. Merriman (1986) found that children who were introduced to both or all names initially accepted one object having multiple names. Markman and Wachtel (1988) hypothesize that children preference the taxonomic constraint when it interferes with the mutual exclusivity assumption. Merriman and Bowman (1989) found that when children have a specific name for an object, they'd use that name if the object was atypical. The example they use is if a unique car was a "bave," children would not call it a "car." Just like any of the assumptions, it's hard if not impossible to tell where one assumption starts and another stops.

== Noun-category bias ==
The noun-category bias suggests that children learn nouns more quickly than any other syntactic category. It has been found to appear in young children as early as the age of two and is used to help children differentiate between syntactic categories such as nouns and adjectives. Preschool-age children have been found to be inclined to interpret words from just one linguistic category- nouns. Gentner proposes that this might be due to the fact that nouns represent a more concrete object.

The noun-category bias places regulations on the possible interpretations that a child might attach to a newly encountered noun. Experiments from Waxman and Gelman as well as Markman and Hutchinson provide results which support the claim that children show preference for categorical relations over random hypothesizing when learning new nouns. This suggests a correlation between language and thought and provides evidence for the theory that syntax and semantics are related. Kauschke and Hofmeister divide the noun-category bias into four separate components: (1) nouns are acquired earlier than verbs and other word classes; (2) nouns form the majority of children’s early vocabularies; (3) nouns in children’s early vocabulary are predominantly object labels; (4) a preference for nouns promotes further language development.

Noun-category bias is supported by the translation hypothesis, which finds that children translate new words into something more familiar. A familiar category allows children to translate novel nouns into understandable contexts. The translation hypothesis may be contradicted by research that does not find a correlation between naming and taxonomical choice.

Research has found that a noun bias exists in at least English, French, Dutch, German, Spanish, Hebrew, and Japanese. However, conflicting data from Korean, Mandarin, and Turkish leads researchers to believe that the noun-category bias may be language dependent. Dhillon claims that whether or not a language displays a noun-category bias depends on a language's null subject parameter

== Shape bias ==
The shape bias proposes that children apply names to same-shaped objects. This stems from the idea that children are associative learners that have abstract category knowledge at many different levels. They should be able to identify specifics of each category (e.g. pickles are round, long, green, and bumpy). This knowledge aids children in categorizing newly encountered objects. The shape bias is a widely contested area of study in psycholinguistics. As of now, identically performed experiments have provided evidence that can be used to argue either for or against the shape bias. The argument is, essentially, whether or not there is a shift in language learning from perceptual to conceptual.

Perception plays a part in child development, however, it is a matter of to what extent. According to the shape bias, children would choose same-shaped object no matter which category they belonged to. For example, the word cat would mean all things that are cat-shaped. The juxtaposition to this is that children refer to kinds of objects which share unforeseen properties and perceptual features. For example, the word cat would refer to the idea of cats which share a same basic, though not exact, shape and often behave similarly.

Cimpian and Markman argue for this view. Their research found that children were less likely to extend a shape bias when other alternative methods of categorization were offered. However, Smith and Samuelson argue that Cimpian and Markman tested only already known lexical categories which negates the effects of simulating word learning. In addition, they argue that the shape bias is not to be considered as the exclusive tool used in word learning, only that it aids the process.
