= Fast mapping =

Term used in cognitive psychology

In cognitive psychology, fast mapping is the term used for the hypothesized mental process whereby a new concept is learned (or a new hypothesis formed) based only on minimal exposure to a given unit of information (e.g., one exposure to a word in an informative context where its referent is present).

Fast mapping is thought by some researchers to be particularly important during language acquisition in young children, and may serve (at least in part) to explain the prodigious rate at which children gain vocabulary. In order to successfully use the fast mapping process, a child must possess the ability to use "referent selection" and "referent retention" of a novel word. There is evidence that this can be done by children as young as two years old, even with the constraints of minimal time and several distractors.

Previous research in fast mapping has also shown that children are able to retain a newly learned word for a substantial amount of time after they are subjected to the word for the first time (Carey and Bartlett, 1978). Further research by Markson and Bloom (1997), showed that children can remember a novel word a week after it was presented to them even with only one exposure to the novel word. While children have also displayed the ability to have equal recall for other types of information, such as novel facts, their ability to extend the information seems to be unique to novel words. This suggests that fast mapping is a specified mechanism for word learning. The process was first formally articulated and the term 'fast mapping' coined Susan Carey and Elsa Bartlett in 1978.

== Evidence against ==
Today, there is evidence to suggest that children do not learn words through 'fast mapping' but rather learn probabilistic, predictive relationships between objects and sounds that develop over time. Evidence for this comes, for example, from children's struggles to understand color words: although infants can distinguish between basic color categories, many sighted children use color words in the same way that blind children do up until the fourth year. Typically, words such as "blue" and "yellow" appear in their vocabularies and they produce them in appropriate places in speech, but their application of individual color terms is haphazard and interchangeable. If shown a blue cup and asked its color, typical three-year-olds seem as likely to answer "red" as "blue." These difficulties persist up until around age four, even after hundreds of explicit training trials. The inability for children to understand color stems from the cognitive process of whole object constraint. Whole object constraint is the idea that a child will understand that a novel word represents the entirety of that object. Then, if the child is presented with further novel words, they attach inferred meanings to the object. However, color is the last attribute to be considered because it explains the least about the object itself. Children's behavior clearly indicates that they have knowledge of these words, but this knowledge is far from complete; rather it appears to be predictive, as opposed to all-or-none.

=== Alternate theories ===
An alternate theory of deriving the meaning of newly learned words by young children during language acquisition stems from John Locke's "associative proposal theory". Compared to the "intentional proposal theory", associative proposal theory refers to the deduction of meaning by comparing the novel object to environmental stimuli. A study conducted by Yu & Ballard (2007), introduced cross-situational learning, a method based on Locke's theory. Cross-situational learning theory is a mechanism in which the child learns meaning of words over multiple exposures in varying contexts in an attempt to eliminate uncertainty of the word's true meaning on an exposure-by-exposure basis.

On the other hand, more recent studies suggest that some amount of fast mapping does take place, questioning the validity of previous laboratory studies that aim to show that probabilistic learning does occur. A critique to the theory of fast mapping is how can children connect the meaning of the novel word with the novel word after just one exposure? For example, when showing a child a blue ball and saying the word "blue" how does the child know that the word blue explains the color of the ball, not the size, or shape? If children learn words by fast mapping, then they must use inductive reasoning to understand the meaning associated with the novel word. A popular theory to explain this inductive reasoning is that children apply word-learning constraints to the situation where a novel word is introduced. There are speculations as to why this is; Markman and Wachtel (1988) conducted a study that helps explain the possible underlying principles of fast mapping. They claim children adhere to the theories of whole-object bias, the assumption that a novel label refers to the entire object rather than its parts, color, substance or other properties, and mutual exclusivity bias, the assumption that only one label applies to each object. In their experiment, children were presented with an object that they either were familiar with or was presented with a whole object term. Markman and Watchel concluded that the mere juxtaposition between familiar and novel terms may assist in part term acquisition. In other words, children will put constraints on themselves and assume the novel term refers to the whole object in view rather than to its parts. There have been six lexical constraints proposed (reference, extendibility, object scope, categorical scope, novel name, conventionality) that guide a child's learning of a novel word. When learning a new word children apply these constraints. However, this purposed method of constraints is not flawless. If children use these constraints there are many words that children will never learn such as actions, attributes, and parts. Studies have found that both toddlers and adults were more likely to categorize an object by its shape than its size or color.

== Cross-situational learning versus propose but verify ==
The next question in fast mapping theory is how exactly is the meaning of the novel word learned? An experiment performed in October 2012 by the Department of Psychology by University of Pennsylvania, researchers attempted to determine if fast mapping occurs via cross-situational learning or by another method, "Propose but verify". In cross-situational learning, listeners hear a novel word and store multiple conjectures of what the word could mean based on its situational context. Then after multiple exposures the listener is able to target the meaning of the word by ruling out conjectures. In propose but verify, the learner makes a single conjecture about the meaning of the word after hearing the word used in context. The learner then carries that conjecture forward to be reevaluated and modified for consistency when the word is used again. The results of the experiment seems to support that propose but verify is the way by which learners fast map new words.

=== Criticisms ===
There is also controversy over whether words learned by fast mapping are retained or forgotten. Previous research has found that generally, children retain a newly learned word for a period of time after learning. In the aforementioned Carey and Bartlett study (1978), children who were taught the word "chromium" were found to keep the new lexical entry in working memory for several days, illustrating a process of gradual lexical alignment known as "extended mapping." Another study, performed by Markson and Bloom (1997), showed that children remembered words up to 1 month after the study was conducted. However, more recent studies have shown that words learned by fast mapping tend to be forgotten over time. In a study conducted by Vlach and Sandhofer (2012), memory supports, which had been included in previous studies, were removed. This removal appeared to result in a low retention of words over time. This is a possible explanation for why previous studies showed high retention of words learned by fast mapping.

Some researchers are concerned that experiments testing for fast mapping are produced in artificial settings. They feel that fast mapping doesn't occur as often in more real life, natural situations. They believe that testing for fast mapping should focus more on the actual understanding of a word instead of just its reproduction. For some, testing to see if the child can use the new word in a different situation constitutes true knowledge of a word, rather than simply identifying the new word.

== Variables affecting an individual's fast mapping ability ==
=== Bilingualism ===
When learning novel words, it is believed that early exposure to multiple linguistic systems facilitates the acquisition of new words later in life. This effect was referred to by Kaushanskaya and Marian (2009) as the bilingual advantage. That being said, a bilingual individual's ability to fast map can vary greatly throughout their life.

During the language acquisition process, a child may require a greater amount of time to determine a correct referent than a child who is a monolingual speaker. By the time a bilingual child is of school age, they perform equally on naming tasks when compared to monolingual children. By the age of adulthood, bilingual individuals have acquired word-learning strategies believed to be of assistance on fast mapping tasks. One example is speech practice, a strategy where the participant listens and reproduces the word in order to assist in remembering and decrease the likelihood of forgetting . Bilingualism can increase an individual's cognitive abilities and contribute to their success in fast mapping words, even when they are using a nonnative language.

=== Socioeconomic status ===
Children growing up in a low-socioeconomic status environment receive less attention than those in high-socioeconomic status environments. As a result, these children may be exposed to fewer words and therefore their language development may suffer. On norm-references vocabulary tests, children from low- socioeconomic homes tend to score lower than same-age children from a high-socioeconomic environment. However, when examining their fast mapping abilities there were no significant differences observed in their ability to learn and remember novel words. Children from low SES families were able to use multiple sources of information in order to fast map novel words. When working with children from low SES homes, providing a context of the word that attributes meaning, is a linguistic strategy that can benefit the child's word knowledge development.

=== Face-to-face interaction ===
Three learning supports that have been proven to help with the fast mapping of words are saliency, repetition and generation of information. The amount of face-to-face interaction a child has with their parent affects his or her ability to fast map novel words. Interaction with a parent leads to greater exposure to words in different contexts, which in turn promotes language acquisition. Face to face interaction cannot be replaced by educational shows because although repetition is used, children do not receive the same level of correction or trial and error from simply watching. When a child is asked to generate the word it promotes the transition to long-term memory to a larger extent.

== Evidence of fast mapping in other animals ==
It appears that fast mapping is not only limited to humans, but can occur in dogs as well.

The first example of fast mapping in dogs was published in 2004. In it, a dog named Rico was able to learn the labels of over 200 various items. He was also able to identify novel objects simply by exclusion learning. Exclusion learning occurs when one learns the name of a novel object because one is already familiar with the names of other objects belonging to the same group. The researchers, who conducted the experiment, mention the possibility that a language acquisition device specific to humans does not control fast mapping. They believe that fast mapping is possibly directed by simple memory mechanisms.

In 2010, a second example was published. This time, a dog named Chaser demonstrated, in a controlled research environment, that she had learned over 1000 object names. She also demonstrated that she could attribute these objects to named categories through fast mapping inferential reasoning. It's important to note that, at the time of publication, Chaser was still learning object names at the same pace as before. Thus, her 1000 words, or lexicals, should not be regarded as an upper limit, but a benchmark. While there are many components of language that were not demonstrated in this study, the 1000 word benchmark is remarkable because many studies on language learning correlate a 1000 lexical vocabulary with, roughly, 75% spoken language comprehension.

Another study on Chaser was published in 2013. In this study, Chaser demonstrated flexible understanding of simple sentences. In these sentences, syntax was altered in various contexts to prove she had not just memorized full phrases or inferred the expectation through gestures from her evaluators. Discovering this skill in a dog is noteworthy on its own, but verb meaning can be fast mapped through syntax. This creates questions about what parts of speech dogs could infer, as previous studies focused on nouns. These findings create further questions about the fast mapping abilities of dogs when viewed in light of a study published in Science in 2016 that proved dogs process lexical and intonational cues separately. That is, they respond to both tone and word meaning.

However, excitement about the fast-mapping skills of dogs should be tempered. Research in humans has found fast-mapping abilities and vocabulary size are not correlated in unenriched environments. Research has determined that language exposure alone is not enough to develop vocabulary through fast-mapping. Instead, the learner needs to be an active participant in communications to convert fast-mapping abilities into vocabulary.

It is not commonplace to communicate with dogs, nor any non-primate animal, in a productive fashion as they are non-verbal. As such, Chaser's vocabulary and sentence comprehension is attributed to Dr. Pilley's rigorous methodology.

== In the deaf population ==
A study by Lederberg et al., was performed to determine if deaf and hard of hearing children fast map to learn novel words. In the study, when the novel word was introduced, the word was both spoken and signed. Then the children were asked to identify the referent object and even extend the novel word to identify a similar object. The results of the study indicated that deaf and hard of hearing children do perform fast mapping to learn novel words. However, compared to children with normal hearing (aging toddlers to 5 years old) the deaf and hard of hearing children did not fast map as accurately and successfully. The results showed a slight delay which disappeared as the children were a maximum of 5 years old. The conclusion that was drawn from the study is that the ability to fast map has a relationship to the size of the lexicon. The children with normal hearing had a larger lexicon and therefore were able to more accurately fast map compared to deaf and hard of hearing children who did not have as large of a lexicon. It is by around age 5 that deaf and hard of hearing children have a similar size lexicon to 5-year-old children of normal hearing. This evidence supports the idea that fast mapping requires inductive reasoning so the larger the lexicon (number of known words) the easier it is for the child to reason out the accurate meaning for the novel word.

In the area of cochlear implants (CIs), there are variegated opinions on whether cochlear implants impact a child's ability to become a more successful fast mapper. In 2000, a study by Kirk, Myomoto, and others determined that there was a general correlation between the age of cochlear implant implementation and improved lexical skills (e.g. fast mapping and other vocabulary growth skills). They believed that children given implants prior to two years of age yielded higher success rates than older children between five and seven years of age. With that said, researchers at the University of Iowa wish to amend that very generalization. In 2013, "Word Learning Processes in Children with Cochlear Implants" by Elizabeth Walker and others indicated that although there may be some levels of increased vocabulary acquisition in CI individuals, many post-implantees generally were slower developers of his/her own lexicon. Walker bases her claims on another research study in 2007 (Tomblin et al.) One of the purposes of this study was to note a CI child's ability to comprehend and retain novel words with related referents. When compared with non-deaf children, the CI children had lower success scores in retention. This finding was based on scorings obtained from their test: from 0 to 6 (0 the worst, 6 the best), CI children averaged a score around a 2.0 whereas non-deaf children scored higher (roughly 3.86).

== In individuals with ADHD ==
An experiment was performed to assess fast mapping in adults with typical language abilities, disorders of spoken/written language (hDSWL), and adults with hDSWL and ADHD. The conclusion draws from the experiment revealed that adults with ADHD were the least accurate at "mapping semantic features and slower to respond to lexical labels." The article reasoned that the tasks of fast mapping requires high attentional demand and so "a lapse in attention could lead to diminished encoding of the new information."

== In individuals with language deficits ==
Fast mapping in individuals with aphasia has gained research attention due to its effect on speaking, listening, reading, and writing. Research done by Blumstein makes an important distinction between those with Broca's aphasia, who are limited in physical speech, as compared to those with Wernicke's aphasia, who cannot link words with meaning. In Broca's aphasia, Blumstein found that whereas individuals with Wernicke's aphasia performed at the same level as the normal control group, those with Broca's aphasia showed slower reaction times for word presentations after reduced voice onset time stimuli. In short, when stimuli were acoustically altered, individuals with Broca's aphasia experienced difficulty recognizing the novel stimuli upon second presentation. Bloomstein's findings reinforce the crucial difference between one's ability to retain novel stimuli versus the ability to express novel stimuli. Because individuals with Wernicke's aphasia are only limited in their understanding of semantic meaning, it makes sense that the participant's novel stimulus recall would not be affected. On the other hand, those with Broca's aphasia lack the ability to produce speech, in effect hindering their ability to recall novel stimuli. Although individuals with Broca's aphasia are limited in their speech production, it is not clear whether they simply cannot formulate the physical speech or if they actually did not process the stimuli.

Research has also been done investigating fast mapping abilities in children with language deficits. One study done by Dollaghan compared children with normal language to those with expressive syntactic deficits, a type of specific language impairment characterized by simplified speech. The study found that normal and language impaired children did not differ in their ability to connect the novel word to referent or to comprehend the novel word after a single exposure. The only difference was that the language-impaired children were less successful in their production of the novel word. This implies that expressive language deficits are unrelated to the ability to connect word and referent in a single exposure. The problem for children with those deficits arises only when trying to convert that mental representation into verbal speech.

== In individuals with intellectual disabilities ==
A few researchers looked at fast mapping abilities in boys with autistic spectrum disorders (ASD), also referred to as autism spectrum, and boys with fragile X syndrome (FXS). The experimental procedure consisted of a presentation phase where two objects were presented, one of which was a novel object with a nonsense word name. This was followed by a comprehension testing phase, which assessed the boys' ability to remember and correctly select the novel objects. Even though all groups in the study had fast mapping performances above chance levels, in comparison to boys showing typical development, those with ASD and FXS demonstrated much more difficulty in comprehending and remembering names assigned to the novel objects. The authors concluded that initial processes involved in associative learning, such as fast mapping, are hindered in boys with FXS and ASD.

== Computational models ==
Research in artificial intelligence and machine learning to reproduce computationally this ability, termed one-shot learning. This is pursued to reduce the learning curve, as other models like reinforcement learning need thousand of exposures to a situation to learn it.
