= John W. Du Bois =

American linguist

John W Du Bois is a professor of linguistics at University of California, Santa Barbara.

He specialises in discourse and grammar, sociocultural linguistics, linguistic anthropology, spoken corpus linguistics, Mayan linguistics, English linguistics, and evolutionary linguistics.

Du Bois is a key figure in research on stance, dialogic syntax, argument structure, referential pragmatics and discourse representation. Du Bois is the Director of the Santa Barbara Corpus of Spoken American English, comprising transcriptions, audio, and timestamps which correlate transcription and audio at the level of individual intonation units.
