= EXMARaLDA =

Linguistic research software

- Developer(s): Thomas Schmidt and Kai Wörner, from the Special Research Centre on Multilingualism - University of Hamburg.
- Initial release: 2001
- Written in: Java
- Operating system: Windows, Linux, Macintosh, FreeBSD, Solaris
- Available in: English, German, French, Swedish, Turkish
- Type: Corpus manager, Linguistic research software
- License: GNU GPL
- Website: exmaralda.org

EXMARaLDA (Extensible Markup Language for Discourse Annotation) is a set of free software tools for creating, managing and analyzing spoken language corpora. It consists of a transcription tool (comparable to tools like Praat or Transcriber), a tool for administering corpus meta data and a tool for doing queries (KWIC searches) on spoken language corpora. EXMARaLDA is used for doing conversation and discourse analysis, dialectology, phonology and research into first and second language acquisition in children and adults. EXMARaLDA is based on the open standards XML and Unicode and programmed in Java.
