= PCVC Speech Dataset =

The PCVC (Persian Consonant Vowel Combination) Speech Dataset is a Modern Persian speech corpus for speech recognition and also speaker recognition. The dataset contains sound samples of Modern Persian combination of vowel and consonant phonemes from different speakers. Every sound sample contains just one consonant and one vowel So it is somehow labeled in phoneme level. This dataset consists of 23 Persian consonants and 6 vowels. The sound samples are all possible combinations of vowels and consonants (138 samples for each speaker). The sample rate of all speech samples is 48000 which means there are 48000 sound samples in every 1 second. Every sound sample starts with consonant then continues with vowel. In each sample, in average, 0.5 second of each sample is speech and the rest is silence. Each sound sample ends with silence. All of sound samples are denoised with "Adaptive noise reduction" algorithm. Compared to Farsdat speech dataset and Persian speech corpus it is more easy to use because it is prepared in .mat data files. Also it is more based on phoneme based separation and all samples are denoised.

== Contents ==
The corpus is downloadable from its Kaggle web page, and contains the following:

- .mat data files of sound samples in a 23*6*30000 matrix, in which 23 is number of consonants, 6 is the number of vowels and 30000 is the length of sound sample.

== See also ==
- Comparison of datasets in machine learning
