= English Phonetics and Phonology =

English Phonetics and Phonology may refer to:

- English phonology
- English Phonetics and Phonology: An Introduction, book by Philip Carr
- English Phonetics and Phonology: A Practical Course, book by Peter Roach
