= List of children's speech corpora =

A child speech corpus is a speech corpus documenting first-language language acquisition. Such databases are used in the development of computer-assisted language learning systems and the characterization of children's speech at difference ages. Children's speech varies not only by language, but also by region within a language. It can also be different for specific groups like autistic children, especially when emotion is considered. Thus different databases are needed for different populations. Corpora are available for American and British English as well as for many other European languages.

== Overview of Children's Speech Corpora ==
In the table below, the age range may be described in terms of school grades. "K" denotes "kindergarten" while "G" denotes "grade". For example, an age range of "K - G10" refers to speakers ranging from kindergarten age to grade 10.

This table is based on a paper from the Interspeech conference, 2016. This online article is intended to provide an interactive table for readers and a place where information about children speech corpora that can be updated continuously by the speech research community.

Corpus	Author	Languages	# Speakers	# Utt.	Duration	Age Range	Date	Remarks
Boulder Learning—MyST Corpus (v0.4.0)	Cole et al.	English	1371	228,874	~393h	G3 - G5	2019	dialog interaction between a student and a virtual tutor on science topics; typically 20-40 minute (wall clock) duration of a session; roughly 49% of the utterances have been transcribed, and more being transcribed. volunteers encouraged. available free for research; flat $10K for commercial use.
CMU Kids Corpus	Eskenazi	English	24M, 52F	5180		6 - 11	1997	
CSLU Kids' Speech Corpus	Shobaki	English	1100	1017		K - G10	2007	
PF-STAR Children's Speech Corpus	Russell	English,	158		~14.5h	4 - 14	2006	word-level transcriptions
CALL-SLT	Rayner	German		5000			2014	
TBALL	Kazemgadeh	English	256	5000	40h	K - G4	2005	partially non-native speech
CASS_CHILD	Gao	Mandarin	23			1 - 4	2012	phonetic transcriptions
CU Children's Read and Prompted Speech Corpus	Hagen	English	663	~100		K - G5	2001	consists of isolated words, sentences and short spontaneous story telling; word-level transcriptions
CU Story Corpus	Hagen	English	106	5000	40h	G3 - G5	2003	consists of story prompts and spontaneous spoken summary of the material; word-level transcriptions
Providence Corpus	Demuth	English	6		363h	1 - 3	2006	mother-child spontaneous speech interactions; broad phonetic transcription
Lyon Corpus	Demuth	French	4		185h	1 - 3	2007	mother-child spontaneous speech interactions; broad phonetic transcription
Demuth Sesotho Corpus	Demuth	Sesotho	4	~13250	98h	2 - 4	1992	family/peer spontaneous speech interactions; morphologically tagged
CHIEDE	Garrote	Spanish	59	15444	~8h		2008	spontaneous conversation, personal interviews, adult-child interaction; orthographic transcriptions; automatic phonological transcription
TIDIGITS	Leonard	English	326 (101 children)			6 - 15	1993	mix of adult and child speakers
FAU Aibo Emotion Corpus	Steidl	German	51		9h	10 - 13		human-annotated with 11 emotion categories
Swedish NICE Corpus	Bell	Swedish	5580			8 - 15	2005	consists of child-machine and adult-child interactions; orthographic transcriptions
SingaKids-Mandarin	Chen	Mandarin	255	79,843	125h	7 - 12	2016	word and phone-level transcriptions; human-annotated proficiency ratings
CFSC	Pascual	Filipino	57		~8h	6-11	2012	consists of children's read speech; contains both good pronunciations and reading miscues; partially transcribed to word- and phoneme-levels

== See also ==
- Computer-assisted language learning
- Language acquisition
- Language development
- Non-native speech database
