= Peter Roach (phonetician) =

British retired phonetician (born 1943)

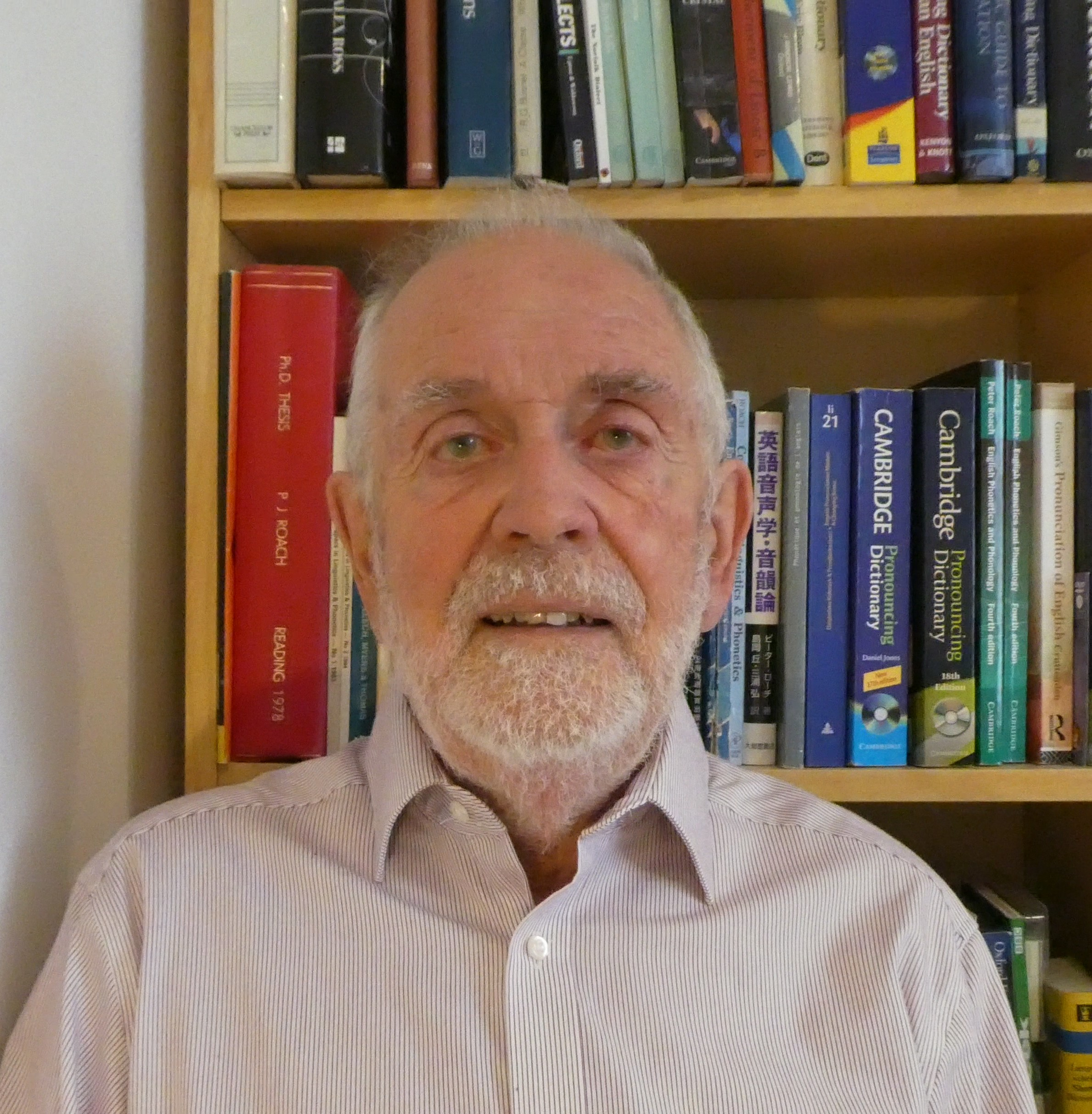
- Born: Peter John Roach; 30 June 1943 (age 83); London
- Occupation: Phonetician
- Notable work: English Phonetics and Phonology; English Pronouncing Dictionary, eds. 15–18
- Website: peterroach.net

Peter John Roach (born 30 June 1943) is a British retired phonetician. He taught at the Universities of Leeds and Reading, and is best known for his work on the pronunciation of British English.

== Education ==
Peter Roach studied Classics at the Priory Grammar School for Boys, Shrewsbury. At Oxford University (Brasenose College, 1962–1966) he took Classical Honour Moderations before graduating in psychology and philosophy (PPP). He studied teaching English overseas at Manchester University then went on to University College London to take a postgraduate course in phonetics. Later, while a lecturer at the University of Reading, he completed a PhD which was awarded in 1978.

== Career ==
From 1968 to 1978 he was Lecturer in Phonetics at the University of Reading, UK, and for the academic year 1975–1976 was Profesor Encargado de Curso in the Department of English at the University of Seville, Spain, on leave from Reading University. He moved to the University of Leeds in 1978, initially as Senior Lecturer in Phonetics. Subsequently, after moving to the Department of Psychology, he was appointed Professor of Cognitive Psychology. He returned to the University of Reading in 1994 as Professor of Phonetics, later becoming head of the School of Linguistics and Applied Language Studies.

He retired in 2004 with the title of Emeritus Professor of Phonetics.

== Writing ==
His best-known publication is English Phonetics and Phonology (C.U.P.). The book was first published in 1983 and is now in its 4th edition (2009). An enhanced e-book edition was published in 2013. He has been the principal editor of the Cambridge English Pronouncing Dictionary for all editions from the 15th (1997) to the current 18th (2011) which is also published in CD-ROM format and an Apple app. Other books include Phonetics (OUP, 2001), in the series 'Oxford Introductions to Language Study', and Introducing Phonetics (Penguin, 1992). Since the latter became out of print, Roach has made it available in PDF format on the internet as A Little Encyclopaedia of Phonetics. He has published a large number of research papers and been an invited speaker in fifteen countries.

== Research ==
He has held a number of grants for speech research. He was principal investigator of the ESRC-funded project that resulted in the MARSEC machine-readable version of the Spoken English Corpus, and was project director of the European-funded project that produced the BABEL multi-language speech corpus. He was a partner in the European project SPECO that produced a computer-based training system to improve deaf children's speech.

== Selected publications ==
=== Books ===
- Roach, Peter (1983) English Phonetics and Phonology, First Edition, Cambridge University Press. Second Edition 1991, 262 p. ISBN 0-521-40718-4. Fourth Edition 2009, ISBN 978-0-521-71740-3. Enhanced E-book edition, 2013.
- Roach, Peter (ed.) (1992) Computing in Linguistics and Phonetics, Academic Press. ISBN 0-12-589340-X
- Roach, Peter (2001) Phonetics, Oxford University Press (Oxford Introductions to Language Studies series) ISBN 0-19-437239-1
- Roach, P., Esling, J. and Setter, J. (2011) (original editor Daniel Jones) The Cambridge English Pronouncing Dictionary, 18th Edition, Cambridge University Press, ISBN 978-0-521-15255-6

=== Papers ===
- Roach, P.J. (1980). "Reaction time measurement of laryngeal closure". Journal of Phonetics. 8 (3): 305–315. doi:10.1016/s0095-4470(19)31480-9.
- Roach, P. "On the distinction between "stress-timed" and "syllable-timed" languages". In Crystal, D. (ed.). Linguistic Controversies (PDF). London: Edward Arnold. pp. 73–79.
- Roach, P.J. (1987). "Rethinking phonetic taxonomy". Transactions of the Philological Society. 85: 24–37. doi:10.1111/j.1467-968X.1987.tb00710.x.
- Roach, P.J.; Knowles, G.O.; Varadi, T.; Arnfield, S.C. (1994). "MARSEC: A MAchine-Readable Spoken English Corpus". Journal of the International Phonetic Association. 23 (2): 47–54. doi:10.1017/s0025100300004849. S2CID 145797962.
- Roach, P.J. (1994). "Conversion between prosodic transcription systems: "Standard British" and ToBI". Speech Communication. 15 (1–2): 91–99. doi:10.1016/0167-6393(94)90044-2.
- Roach, P.J.; Arnfield, S.C. (1995). "Linking prosodic transcription to the time dimension". In Leech, G.; Myers, G.; Thomas, J. (eds.). Spoken English on Computer. Longman. pp. 149–160.
- Roach, P. (1998). "Some languages are spoken more quickly than others". In Bauer, L.; Trudgill, P. (eds.). Language Myths. Penguin. pp. 150–159.
- Roach, P. (2000). "Techniques for the description of emotional speech". In Cowie, R.; Douglas-Cowie, E.; Schroeder, M. (eds.). Proceedings of the ISCA Workshop on Speech and Emotion. pp. 53–59.
- Roach, P.J. (2004). "Illustrations of the IPA. British English: Received Pronunciation". Journal of the IPA. 34 (2): 239–245.
- Roach, P.J. (2004). "Representing the English Model". In Dzubialska, K.; Przedlacka, J. (eds.). English Pronunciation Models: A Changing Scene. Peter Lang. pp. 393–399.
