= Language acquisition =

Process in which a first language is acquired

Language acquisition is the process by which humans acquire the capacity to perceive and comprehend language. In other words, it is how human beings gain the ability to be aware of language, to understand it, and to produce and use words and sentences to communicate.

Language acquisition involves structures, rules, and representation. The capacity to successfully use language requires human beings to acquire a range of tools, including phonology, morphology, syntax, semantics, and an extensive vocabulary. Language can be vocalized as in speech, or manual as in sign. Human language capacity is represented in the brain. Even though human language capacity is finite, one can say and understand an effectively infinite number of sentences, which is based on a syntactic principle called recursion. Evidence suggests that every individual has three recursive mechanisms that allow sentences to go indeterminately. These three mechanisms are: relativization, complementation and coordination.

There are two main guiding principles in first-language acquisition: speech perception always precedes speech production, and the gradually evolving system by which a child learns a language is built up one step at a time, beginning with the distinction between individual phonemes.

For many years, linguists interested in child language acquisition have questioned how language is acquired. Lidz et al. state, "The question of how these structures are acquired, then, is more properly understood as the question of how a learner takes the surface forms in the input and converts them into abstract linguistic rules and representations."

Language acquisition usually refers to first-language acquisition. It studies infants' acquisition of their native language, whether that is a spoken language or a sign language, though it can also refer to bilingual first language acquisition (BFLA), referring to an infant's simultaneous acquisition of two native languages. This is distinguished from second-language acquisition, which deals with the acquisition (in both children and adults) of additional languages. On top of speech, reading and writing a language with an entirely different script increases the complexities of true foreign language literacy. Language acquisition is one of the quintessential human traits.

== History ==
Some early observation-based ideas about language acquisition were proposed by Plato, who felt that word-meaning mapping in some form was innate. Additionally, Sanskrit grammarians debated for over twelve centuries whether humans' ability to recognize the meaning of words was god-given (possibly innate) or passed down by previous generations and learned from already established conventions: a child learning the word for cow by listening to trusted speakers talking about cows.

Philosophers in ancient societies were interested in how humans acquired the ability to understand and produce language well before empirical methods for testing those theories were developed, but for the most part they seemed to regard language acquisition as a subset of man's ability to acquire knowledge and learn concepts.

Empiricists, like Thomas Hobbes and John Locke, argued that knowledge (and, for Locke, language) emerge ultimately from abstracted sense impressions. These arguments lean towards the "nurture" side of the argument: that language is acquired through sensory experience, which led to Rudolf Carnap's Aufbau, an attempt to learn all knowledge from sense datum, using the notion of "remembered as similar" to bind them into clusters, which would eventually map into language.

Proponents of behaviorism argued that language may be learned through a form of operant conditioning. In B. F. Skinner's Verbal Behavior (1957), he suggested that the successful use of a sign, such as a word or lexical unit, given a certain stimulus, reinforces its "momentary" or contextual probability. Since operant conditioning is contingent on reinforcement by rewards, a child would learn that a specific combination of sounds means a specific thing through repeated successful associations made between the two. A "successful" use of a sign would be one in which the child is understood (for example, a child saying "up" when they want to be picked up) and rewarded with the desired response from another person, thereby reinforcing the child's understanding of the meaning of that word and making it more likely that they will use that word in a similar situation in the future. Some empiricist theories of language acquisition include the statistical learning theory. Charles F. Hockett of language acquisition, relational frame theory, functionalist linguistics, social interactionist theory, and usage-based language acquisition.

Skinner's behaviorist idea was strongly attacked by Noam Chomsky in a review article in 1959, calling it "largely mythology" and a "serious delusion." Arguments against Skinner's idea of language acquisition through operant conditioning include the fact that children often ignore language corrections from adults. Instead, children typically follow a pattern of using an irregular form of a word correctly, making errors later on, and eventually returning to the proper use of the word. For example, a child may correctly learn the word "gave" (past tense of "give"), and later on use the word "gived". Eventually, the child will typically go back to using the correct word, "gave". Chomsky claimed the pattern is difficult to attribute to Skinner's idea of operant conditioning as the primary way that children acquire language. Chomsky argued that if language were solely acquired through behavioral conditioning, children would not likely learn the proper use of a word and suddenly use the word incorrectly. Chomsky believed that Skinner failed to account for the central role of syntactic knowledge in language competence. Chomsky also rejected the term "learning", which Skinner used to claim that children "learn" language through operant conditioning. Instead, Chomsky argued for a mathematical approach to language acquisition, based on a study of syntax.

== As a typically human phenomenon ==
The capacity to acquire and use language is a key aspect that distinguishes humans from other beings. Although it is difficult to pin down what aspects of language are uniquely human, there are a few design features that can be found in all known forms of human language, but that are missing from forms of animal communication. For example, many animals are able to communicate with each other by signaling to the things around them, but this kind of communication lacks the arbitrariness of human vernaculars (in that there is nothing about the sound of the word "dog" that would hint at its meaning). Other forms of animal communication may utilize arbitrary sounds, but are unable to combine those sounds in different ways to create completely novel messages that can then be automatically understood by another. Hockett called this design feature of human language "productivity". It is crucial to the understanding of human language acquisition that humans are not limited to a finite set of words, but, rather, must be able to understand and utilize a complex system that allows for an infinite number of possible messages. So, while many forms of animal communication exist, they differ from human language in that they have a limited range of vocabulary tokens, and the vocabulary items are not combined syntactically to create phrases.

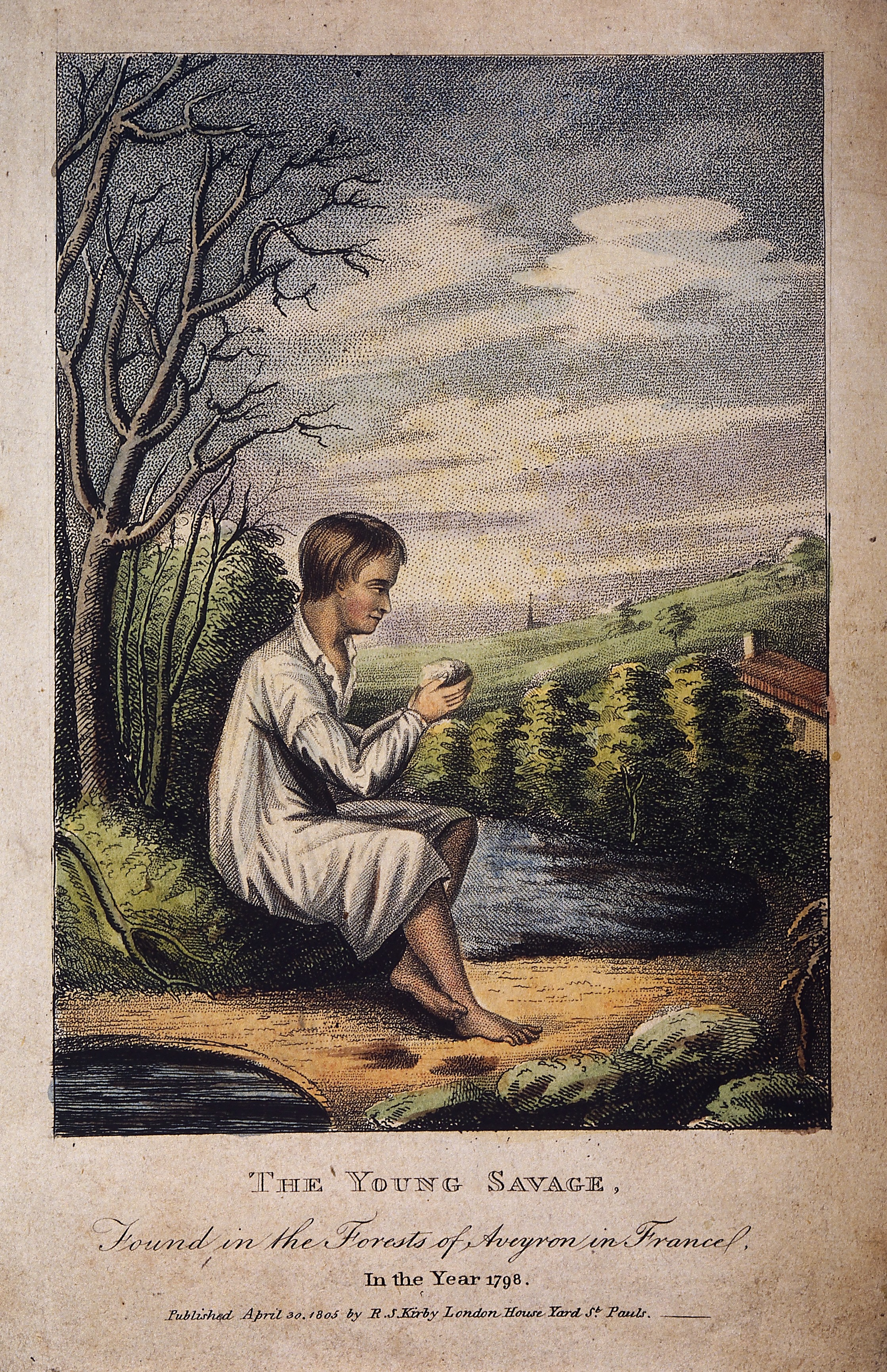
Victor of Aveyron

Herbert S. Terrace conducted a study on a chimpanzee known as Nim Chimpsky in an attempt to teach him American Sign Language. This study was an attempt to further research done with a chimpanzee named Washoe, who was reportedly able to acquire American Sign Language. However, upon further inspection, Terrace concluded that both experiments were failures. While Nim was able to acquire signs, he never acquired a knowledge of grammar, and was unable to combine signs in a meaningful way. Researchers noticed that "signs that seemed spontaneous were, in fact, cued by teachers", and not actually productive. When Terrace reviewed Project Washoe, he found similar results. He postulated that there is a fundamental difference between animals and humans in their motivation to learn language; animals, such as in Nim's case, are motivated only by physical reward, while humans learn language in order to "create a new type of communication".

In another language acquisition study, Jean-Marc-Gaspard Itard attempted to teach Victor of Aveyron, a feral child, how to speak. Victor was able to learn a few words, but ultimately never fully acquired language. A slightly more successful study was done on Genie, another child never introduced to society. She had been entirely isolated for the first thirteen years of her life by her father. Caretakers and researchers attempted to measure her ability to learn a language. She was able to acquire a large vocabulary, but never acquired grammatical knowledge. Researchers concluded that the theory of a critical period was true — Genie was too old to learn how to speak productively, although she was still able to comprehend language.

== General approaches ==
A major debate in understanding language acquisition is how these capacities are picked up by infants from the linguistic input. Input in the linguistic context is defined as "All words, contexts, and other forms of language to which a learner is exposed, relative to acquired proficiency in first or second languages". Nativists such as Chomsky have focused on the hugely complex nature of human grammars, the finiteness and ambiguity of the input that children receive, and the relatively limited cognitive abilities of an infant. From these characteristics, they conclude that the process of language acquisition in infants must be tightly constrained and guided by the biologically given characteristics of the human brain. Otherwise, they argue, it is extremely difficult to explain how children, within the first five years of life, routinely master the complex, largely tacit grammatical rules of their native language. Additionally, the evidence of such rules in their native language is all indirect—adult speech to children cannot encompass all of what children know by the time they have acquired their native language.

Other scholars, however, have resisted the possibility that infants' routine success at acquiring the grammar of their native language requires anything more than the forms of learning seen with other cognitive skills, including such mundane motor skills as learning to ride a bike. In particular, there has been resistance to the possibility that human biology includes any form of specialization for language. This conflict is often referred to as the "nature and nurture" debate. Of course, most scholars acknowledge that certain aspects of language acquisition must result from the specific ways in which the human brain is "wired" (a "nature" component, which accounts for the failure of non-human species to acquire human languages) and that certain others are shaped by the particular language environment in which a person is raised (a "nurture" component, which accounts for the fact that humans raised in different societies acquire different languages). The as-yet unresolved question is the extent to which the specific cognitive capacities in the "nature" component are also used outside of language.

=== Emergentism ===
Emergentist theories, such as Brian MacWhinney's competition model, posit that language acquisition is a cognitive process that emerges from the interaction of biological pressures and the environment. According to these theories, neither nature nor nurture alone is sufficient to trigger language learning; both of these influences must work together in order to allow children to acquire a language. The proponents of these theories argue that general cognitive processes subserve language acquisition and that the result of these processes is language-specific phenomena, such as word learning and grammar acquisition. The findings of many empirical studies support the predictions of these theories, suggesting that language acquisition is a more complex process than many have proposed.

=== Empiricism ===
Although Chomsky's theory of a generative grammar has been enormously influential in the field of linguistics since the 1950s, many criticisms of the basic assumptions of generative theory have been put forth by cognitive-functional linguists, who argue that language structure is created through language use. These linguists argue that the concept of a language acquisition device (LAD) is unsupported by evolutionary anthropology, which tends to show a gradual adaptation of the human brain and vocal cords to the use of language, rather than a sudden appearance of a complete set of binary parameters delineating the whole spectrum of possible grammars ever to have existed and ever to exist. On the other hand, cognitive-functional theorists use this anthropological data to show how human beings have evolved the capacity for grammar and syntax to meet our demand for linguistic symbols. (Binary parameters are common to digital computers, but may not be applicable to neurological systems such as the human brain.)

Further, the generative theory has several constructs (such as movement, empty categories, complex underlying structures, and strict binary branching) that cannot possibly be acquired from any amount of linguistic input. It is unclear that human language is actually anything like the generative conception of it. Since language, as imagined by nativists, is unlearnably complex, subscribers to this theory argue that it must, therefore, be innate. Nativists hypothesize that some features of syntactic categories exist even before a child is exposed to any experience—categories on which children map words of their language as they learn their native language. A different theory of language, however, may yield different conclusions. While all theories of language acquisition posit some degree of innateness, they vary in how much value they place on this innate capacity to acquire language. Empiricism places less value on the innate knowledge, arguing instead that the input, combined with both general and language-specific learning capacities, is sufficient for acquisition.

Since 1980, linguists studying children, such as Melissa Bowerman and Asifa Majid, and psychologists following Jean Piaget, like Elizabeth Bates and Jean Mandler, came to suspect that there may indeed be many learning processes involved in the acquisition process, and that ignoring the role of learning may have been a mistake.

During the 1990s and 2000s, the debate surrounding the nativist position has centered on whether the inborn capabilities are language-specific or domain-general, such as those that enable the infant to visually make sense of the world in terms of objects and actions. The anti-nativist view has many strands, but a frequent theme is that language emerges from usage in social contexts, using learning mechanisms that are a part of an innate general cognitive learning apparatus. This position has been championed by David M. W. Powers, Elizabeth Bates, Catherine Snow, Anat Ninio, Brian MacWhinney, Michael Tomasello, Michael Ramscar, William O'Grady, and others. Philosophers, such as Fiona Cowie and Barbara Scholz with Geoffrey Pullum have also argued against certain nativist claims in support of empiricism.

The new field of cognitive linguistics has emerged as a specific counter to Chomsky's Generative Grammar and to Nativism.

==== Statistical learning ====
Some language acquisition researchers, such as Elissa Newport, Richard Aslin, and Jenny Saffran, emphasize the possible roles of general learning mechanisms, especially statistical learning, in language acquisition. The development of connectionist models that when implemented are able to successfully learn words and syntactical conventions supports the predictions of statistical learning theories of language acquisition, as do empirical studies of children's detection of word boundaries. In a series of connectionist model simulations, Franklin Chang has demonstrated that such a domain general statistical learning mechanism could explain a wide range of language structure acquisition phenomena. Statistical modelling incorporating features of brain anatomy and neural learning mechanisms has also shown how grammatical categories and syntactic relationships can emerge from regularities in linguistic input. Such models include cortical networks that learn from patterns in word sequences and associations between sentences and their meanings. In particular, next-word-prediction learning has enabled statistical models to acquire substantial linguistic abilities (see Large language model), and neural recordings have provided evidence that the human brain also predicts upcoming words during language comprehension. In modelling of cerebellar circuitry, internal representations of syntactic roles can emerge through next-word-prediction learning, without supplying explicit syntactic labels.

Statistical learning theory suggests that, when learning language, a learner would use the natural statistical properties of language to deduce its structure, including sound patterns, words, and the beginnings of grammar. That is, language learners are sensitive to how often syllable combinations or words occur in relation to other syllables. Infants between 21 and 23 months old are also able to use statistical learning to develop "lexical categories", such as an animal category, which infants might later map to newly learned words in the same category. These findings suggest that early experience listening to language is critical to vocabulary acquisition.

The statistical abilities are effective, but also limited by what qualifies as input, what is done with that input, and by the structure of the resulting output. Statistical learning (and more broadly, distributional learning) can be accepted as a component of language acquisition by researchers on either side of the "nature and nurture" debate. From the perspective of that debate, an important question is whether statistical learning can, by itself, serve as an alternative to nativist explanations for the grammatical constraints of human language.

==== Chunking ====
The central idea of these theories is that language development occurs through the incremental acquisition of meaningful chunks of elementary constituents, which can be words, phonemes, or syllables. Several studies conducted in 2005–2007 demonstrated the efficacy of this approach in simulating several phenomena in the acquisition of syntactic categories and the acquisition of phonological knowledge. Research has demonstrated that infants as young as 3–5 months can abstract phonological features amodally, i.e., recognising place of articulation across multiple consonants regardless of whether speech is heard or seen. These early abstraction abilities have been shown to change developmentally across the first year and predict later vocabulary size.

Chunking theories of language acquisition constitute a group of theories related to statistical learning theories, in that they assume that the input from the environment plays an essential role; however, they postulate different learning mechanisms.

Researchers at the Max Planck Institute for Evolutionary Anthropology have developed a computer model analyzing early toddler conversations to predict the structure of later conversations. They showed that toddlers develop their own individual rules for speaking, with 'slots' into which they put certain kinds of words. A significant outcome of this research is that rules inferred from toddler speech were better predictors of subsequent speech than traditional grammars.

This approach has several features that make it unique: the models are implemented as computer programs, which enables clear-cut and quantitative predictions to be made; they learn from naturalistic input—actual child-directed utterances; and attempt to create their own utterances, the model was tested in languages including English, Spanish, and German. Chunking for this model was shown to be most effective in learning a first language but was able to create utterances learning a second language.

=== Relational frame theory ===
The relational frame theory (RFT) (Hayes, Barnes-Holmes, Roche, 2001), provides a wholly selectionist/learning account of the origin and development of language competence and complexity. Based upon the principles of Skinnerian behaviorism, RFT posits that children acquire language purely through interacting with the environment. RFT theorists introduced the concept of functional contextualism in language learning, which emphasizes the importance of predicting and influencing psychological events, such as thoughts, feelings, and behaviors, by focusing on manipulable variables in their own context. RFT distinguishes itself from Skinner's work by identifying and defining a particular type of operant conditioning known as derived relational responding, a learning process that, to date, appears to occur only in humans possessing a capacity for language. Empirical studies supporting the predictions of RFT suggest that children learn language through a system of inherent reinforcements, challenging the view that language acquisition is based upon innate, language-specific cognitive capacities.

=== Social interactionism ===
Social interactionist theory is an explanation of language development emphasizing the role of social interaction between the developing child and linguistically knowledgeable adults. It is based largely on the socio-cultural theories of Soviet psychologist Lev Vygotsky, and was made prominent in the Western world by Jerome Bruner.

Unlike other approaches, it emphasizes the role of feedback and reinforcement in language acquisition. Specifically, it asserts that much of a child's linguistic growth stems from modeling of and interaction with parents and other adults, who very frequently provide instructive correction. It is thus somewhat similar to behaviorist accounts of language learning. It differs substantially, though, in that it posits the existence of a social-cognitive model and other mental structures within children (a sharp contrast to the "black box" approach of classical behaviorism).

Another key idea within the theory of social interactionism is that of the zone of proximal development. This is a theoretical construct denoting the set of tasks a child is capable of performing with guidance but not alone. As applied to language, it describes the set of linguistic tasks (for example, proper syntax, suitable vocabulary usage) that a child cannot carry out on its own at a given time, but can learn to carry out if assisted by an able adult.

=== Syntax, morphology, and generative grammar ===
As syntax began to be studied more closely in the early 20th century in relation to language learning, it became apparent to linguists, psychologists, and philosophers that knowing a language was not merely a matter of associating words with concepts, but that a critical aspect of language involves knowledge of how to put words together; sentences are usually needed in order to communicate successfully, not just isolated words. A child will use short expressions such as Bye-bye Mummy or All-gone milk, which actually are combinations of individual nouns and an operator, before they begin to produce gradually more complex sentences. In the 1990s, within the principles and parameters framework, this hypothesis was extended into a maturation-based structure building model of child language regarding the acquisition of functional categories. In this model, children are seen as gradually building up more and more complex structures, with lexical categories (like noun and verb) being acquired before functional-syntactic categories (like determiner and complementizer). It is also often found that in acquiring a language, the most frequently used verbs are irregular verbs. In learning English, for example, young children first begin to learn the past tense of verbs individually. However, when they acquire a "rule", such as adding -ed to form the past tense, they begin to exhibit occasional overgeneralization errors (e.g. "runned", "hitted") alongside correct past tense forms. One influential proposal regarding the origin of this type of error suggests that the adult state of grammar stores each irregular verb form in memory and also includes a "block" on the use of the regular rule for forming that type of verb. In the developing child's mind, retrieval of that "block" may fail, causing the child to erroneously apply the regular rule instead of retrieving the irregular.

=== Merge (linguistics)-based theory ===
In bare-phrase structure (minimalist program), theory-internal considerations define the specifier position of an internal-merge projection (phases vP and CP) as the only type of host which could serve as potential landing-sites for move-based elements displaced from lower down within the base-generated VP structure—e.g. A-movement such as passives (["The apple was eaten by [John (ate the apple)"]]), or raising ["Some work does seem to remain [(There) does seem to remain (some work)"]]). As a consequence, any strong version of a structure building model of child language which calls for an exclusive "external-merge/argument structure stage" prior to an "internal-merge/scope-discourse related stage" would claim that young children's stage-1 utterances lack the ability to generate and host elements derived via movement operations. In terms of a merge-based theory of language acquisition, complements and specifiers are simply notations for first-merge (= "complement-of" [head-complement]), and later second-merge (= "specifier-of" [specifier-head], with merge always forming to a head. First-merge establishes only a set {a, b} and is not an ordered pair—e.g., an {N, N}-compound of 'boat-house' would allow the ambiguous readings of either 'a kind of house' and/or 'a kind of boat'. It is only with second-merge that order is derived out of a set {a {a, b}} which yields the recursive properties of syntax—e.g., a 'house-boat' {house {house, boat}} now reads unambiguously only as a 'kind of boat'. It is this property of recursion that allows for projection and labeling of a phrase to take place; in this case, that the Noun 'boat' is the Head of the compound, and 'house' acting as a kind of specifier/modifier. External-merge (first-merge) establishes substantive 'base structure' inherent to the VP, yielding theta/argument structure, and may go beyond the lexical-category VP to involve the functional-category light verb vP. Internal-merge (second-merge) establishes more formal aspects related to edge-properties of scope and discourse-related material pegged to CP. In a Phase-based theory, this twin vP/CP distinction follows the "duality of semantics" discussed within the Minimalist Program, and is further developed into a dual distinction regarding a probe-goal relation. As a consequence, at the "external/first-merge-only" stage, young children would show an inability to interpret readings from a given ordered pair, since they would only have access to the mental parsing of a non-recursive set. (See Roeper for a full discussion of recursion in child language acquisition). In addition to word-order violations, other more ubiquitous results of a first-merge stage would show that children's initial utterances lack the recursive properties of inflectional morphology, yielding a strict Non-inflectional stage-1, consistent with an incremental Structure-building model of child language.

Generative grammar, associated especially with the work of Noam Chomsky, is currently one of the approaches to explaining children's acquisition of syntax. Its leading idea is that human biology imposes narrow constraints on the child's "hypothesis space" during language acquisition. In the principles and parameters framework, which has dominated generative syntax since Chomsky's (1980) Lectures on Government and Binding: The Pisa Lectures, the acquisition of syntax resembles ordering from a menu: the human brain comes equipped with a limited set of choices from which the child selects the correct options by imitating the parents' speech while making use of the context.

An important argument which favors the generative approach, is the poverty of the stimulus argument. The child's input (a finite number of sentences encountered by the child, together with information about the context in which they were uttered) is, in principle, compatible with an infinite number of conceivable grammars. Moreover, rarely can children rely on corrective feedback from adults when they make a grammatical error; adults generally respond and provide feedback regardless of whether a child's utterance was grammatical or not, and children have no way of discerning if a feedback response was intended to be a correction. Additionally, when children do understand that they are being corrected, they don't always reproduce accurate restatements. Yet, barring situations of medical abnormality or extreme privation, all children in a given speech-community converge on very much the same grammar by the age of about five years. An especially dramatic example is provided by children who, for medical reasons, are unable to produce speech and, therefore, can never be corrected for a grammatical error but nonetheless, converge on the same grammar as their typically developing peers, according to comprehension-based tests of grammar.

Considerations such as those have led Chomsky, Jerry Fodor, Eric Lenneberg and others to argue that the types of grammar the child needs to consider must be narrowly constrained by human biology (the nativist position). These innate constraints are sometimes referred to as universal grammar, the human "language faculty", or the "language instinct".

=== Comparative method of crosslinguistic research ===
The comparative method of crosslinguistic research applies the comparative method used in historical linguistics to psycholinguistic research. In historical linguistics the comparative method uses comparisons between historically related languages to reconstruct a proto-language and trace the history of each daughter language. The comparative method can be repurposed for research on language acquisition by comparing historically related child languages. The historical ties within each language family provide a roadmap for research. For Indo-European languages, the comparative method would first compare language acquisition within the Slavic, Celtic, Germanic, Romance and Indo-Iranian branches of the family before attempting broader comparisons between the branches. For Otomanguean languages, the comparative method would first compare language acquisition within the Oto-pamean, Chinantecan, Tlapanecan, Popolocan, Zapotecan, Amuzgan and Mixtecan branches before attempting broader comparisons between the branches. The comparative method imposes an evaluation standard for assessing the languages used in language acquisition research.

The comparative method derives its power by assembling comprehensive datasets for each language. Descriptions of the prosody and phonology for each language inform analyses of morphology and the lexicon, which in turn inform analyses of syntax and conversational styles. Information on prosodic structure in one language informs research on the prosody of the related languages and vice versa. The comparative method produces a cumulative research program in which each description contributes to a comprehensive description of language acquisition for each language within a family as well as across the languages within each branch of the language family.

Comparative studies of language acquisition control the number of extraneous factors that impact language development. Speakers of historically related languages typically share a common culture that may include similar lifestyles and child-rearing practices. Historically related languages have similar phonologies and morphologies that impact early lexical and syntactic development in similar ways. The comparative method predicts that children acquiring historically related languages will exhibit similar patterns of language development, and that these common patterns may not hold in historically unrelated languages. The acquisition of Dutch will resemble the acquisition of German, but not the acquisition of Totonac or Mixtec. A claim about any universal of language acquisition must control for the shared grammatical structures that languages inherit from a common ancestor.

Several language acquisition studies have accidentally employed features of the comparative method due to the availability of datasets from historically related languages. Research on the acquisition of the Romance and Scandinavian languages used aspects of the comparative method, but did not produce detailed comparisons across different levels of grammar. The most advanced use of the comparative method to date appears in research on the acquisition of the Mayan languages. This research has yielded detailed comparative studies on the acquisition of phonological, lexical, morphological and syntactic features in eight Mayan languages as well as comparisons of language input and language socialization.

== Representation in the brain ==
Several regions of the human brain participate in the reception, comprehension and production of language. These include the classical 'primary' language centers - Wernicke's area and Broca's area - along with several other brain structures. Recent advances in functional neuroimaging technology have allowed for a better understanding of how language acquisition is manifested physically in the brain. Language acquisition almost always occurs in children during a period of rapid increase in brain volume. At this point in development, a child has many more neural connections than he or she will have as an adult, allowing for the child to be more able to learn new things than he or she would be as an adult. Accordingly, the emergence of brain areas dedicated to language has been hypothesized to result from a combination of the genetically determined complexity of the human brain and the 'functional validation of synapses' during the extended period of human postnatal maturation that is unique among primates.

=== Sensitive period ===
Language acquisition has been studied from the perspective of developmental psychology and neuroscience, which looks at learning to use and understand language parallel to a child's brain development. It has been determined, through empirical research on developmentally normal children, as well as through some extreme cases of language deprivation, that there is a "sensitive period" of language acquisition in which human infants have the ability to learn any language. Several researchers have found that from birth until the age of six months, infants can discriminate the phonetic contrasts of all languages. Researchers believe that this gives infants the ability to acquire the language spoken around them. After this age, the child is able to perceive only the phonemes specific to the language being learned. The reduced phonemic sensitivity enables children to build phonemic categories and recognize stress patterns and sound combinations specific to the language they are acquiring. As Wilder Penfield noted, "Before the child begins to speak and to perceive, the uncommitted cortex is a blank slate on which nothing has been written. In the ensuing years much is written, and the writing is normally never erased. After the age of ten or twelve, the general functional connections have been established and fixed for the speech cortex." According to the sensitive or critical period models, the age at which a child acquires the ability to use language is a predictor of how well he or she is ultimately able to use language. However, there may be an age at which becoming a fluent and natural user of a language is no longer possible; Penfield and Roberts (1959) cap their sensitive period at nine years old. The human brain may very well be automatically wired to learn languages, but this ability does not last into adulthood in the same way that it exists during childhood. By around age 12, language acquisition has typically been solidified, and it becomes more difficult to learn a language in the same way a native speaker would. Just like children who speak, deaf children go through a critical period for learning language. Deaf children who acquire their first language later in life show lower performance in complex aspects of grammar. At that point, it is usually a second language that a person is trying to acquire and not a first.

Assuming that children are exposed to language during the critical period, acquiring language is almost never missed by cognitively normal children. Humans are so well-prepared to learn language that it becomes almost impossible not to. Researchers are unable to experimentally test the effects of the sensitive period of development on language acquisition, because it would be unethical to deprive children of language until this period is over. However, case studies on abused, language-deprived children show that they exhibit extreme limitations in language skills, even after instruction.

At a very young age, children can distinguish different sounds but cannot yet produce them. During infancy, children begin to babble. Deaf babies babble in the same patterns as hearing babies do, showing that babbling is not a result of babies simply imitating certain sounds, but is actually a natural part of the process of language development. Deaf babies do, however, often babble less than hearing babies, and they begin to babble later on in infancy—at approximately 11 months as compared to approximately 6 months for hearing babies.

Prelinguistic language abilities that are crucial for language acquisition have been seen even earlier than infancy. There have been many different studies examining different modes of language acquisition prior to birth. The study of language acquisition in fetuses began in the late 1980s when several researchers independently discovered that very young infants could discriminate their native language from other languages. In Mehler et al. (1988), infants underwent discrimination tests, and it was shown that infants as young as 4 days old could discriminate utterances in their native language from those in an unfamiliar language, but could not discriminate between two languages when neither was native to them. These results suggest that there are mechanisms for fetal auditory learning, and other researchers have found further behavioral evidence to support this notion. Fetus auditory learning through environmental habituation has been seen in a variety of different modes, such as fetus learning of familiar melodies, story fragments (DeCasper & Spence, 1986), recognition of mother's voice, and other studies showing evidence of fetal adaptation to native linguistic environments.

Prosody is the property of speech that conveys an emotional state of the utterance, as well as the intended form of speech, for example, question, statement or command. Some researchers in the field of developmental neuroscience argue that fetal auditory learning mechanisms result solely from discrimination of prosodic elements. Although this would hold merit in an evolutionary psychology perspective (i.e. recognition of mother's voice/familiar group language from emotionally valent stimuli), some theorists argue that there is more than prosodic recognition in elements of fetal learning. Newer evidence shows that fetuses not only react to the native language differently from non-native languages, but that fetuses react differently and can accurately discriminate between native and non-native vowel sounds (Moon, Lagercrantz, & Kuhl, 2013). Furthermore, a 2016 study showed that newborn infants encode the edges of multisyllabic sequences better than the internal components of the sequence (Ferry et al., 2016). Together, these results suggest that newborn infants have learned important properties of syntactic processing in utero, as demonstrated by infant knowledge of native language vowels and the sequencing of heard multisyllabic phrases. This ability to sequence specific vowels gives newborn infants some of the fundamental mechanisms needed in order to learn the complex organization of a language. From a neuroscientific perspective, neural correlates have been found that demonstrate human fetal learning of speech-like auditory stimuli that most other studies have been analyzing (Partanen et al., 2013). In a study conducted by Partanen et al. (2013), researchers presented fetuses with certain word variants and observed that these fetuses exhibited higher brain activity in response to certain word variants as compared to controls. In this same study, "a significant correlation existed between the amount of prenatal exposure and brain activity, with greater activity being associated with a higher amount of prenatal speech exposure," pointing to the important learning mechanisms present before birth that are fine-tuned to features in speech (Partanen et al., 2013).

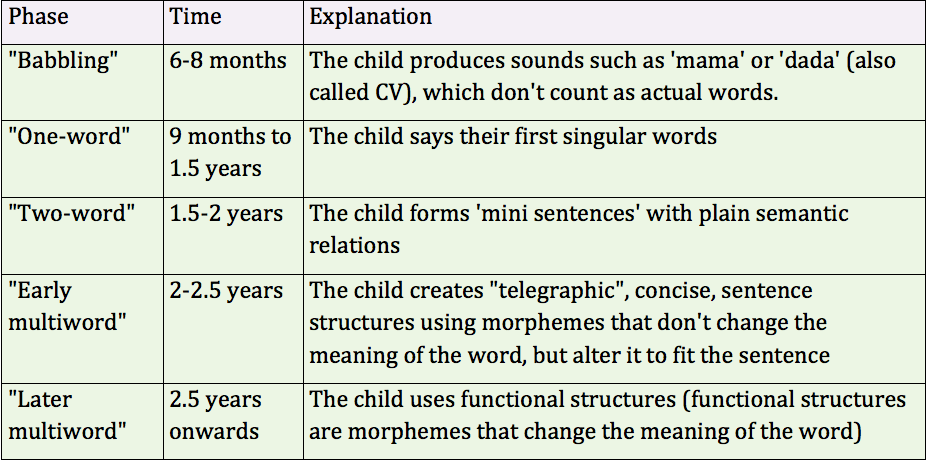
The phases of language acquisition in children

== Vocabulary acquisition ==
Learning a new word, that is, learning to speak this word and speak it on the appropriate occasions, depends upon many factors. First, the learner needs to be able to hear what they are attempting to pronounce. Also required is the capacity to engage in speech repetition. Children with reduced ability to repeat non-words (a marker of speech repetition abilities) show a slower rate of vocabulary expansion than children with normal ability. Several computational models of vocabulary acquisition have been proposed. Various studies have shown that the size of a child's vocabulary by the age of 24 months correlates with the child's future development and language skills. If a child knows fifty or fewer words by the age of 24 months, he or she is classified as a late-talker, and future language development, like vocabulary expansion and the organization of grammar, is likely to be slower and stunted.

Two more crucial elements of vocabulary acquisition are word segmentation and statistical learning (described above). Word segmentation, or the ability to break down words into syllables from fluent speech can be accomplished by eight-month-old infants. By the time infants are 17 months old, they are able to link meaning to segmented words.

Recent evidence also suggests that motor skills and experiences may influence vocabulary acquisition during infancy. Specifically, learning to sit independently between 3 and 5 months of age has been found to predict receptive vocabulary at both 10 and 14 months of age, and independent walking skills have been found to correlate with language skills at around 10 to 14 months of age. These findings show that language acquisition is an embodied process that is influenced by a child's overall motor abilities and development. Studies have also shown a correlation between socioeconomic status and vocabulary acquisition.

== Meaning ==
Children learn, on average, ten to fifteen new word meanings each day, but only one of these can be accounted for by direct instruction. The other nine to fourteen word meanings must have been acquired in some other way. It has been proposed that children acquire these meanings through processes modeled by latent semantic analysis; that is, when they encounter an unfamiliar word, children use contextual information to guess its rough meaning correctly. A child may expand the meaning and use of certain words that are already part of their mental lexicon in order to denominate anything that is somehow related but for which they do not know the specific word. For instance, a child may broaden the use of mummy and dada in order to indicate anything that belongs to their mother or father, or perhaps every person who resembles their own parents; another example might be to say rain while meaning I don't want to go out.

There is also reason to believe that children use various heuristics to infer the meaning of words properly. Markman and others have proposed that children assume words to refer to objects with similar properties ("cow" and "pig" might both be "animals") rather than to objects that are thematically related ("cow" and "milk" are probably not both "animals"). Children also seem to adhere to the "whole object assumption" and think that a novel label refers to an entire entity rather than to one of its parts. This assumption along with other resources, such as grammar and morphological cues or lexical constraints, may help the child in acquiring word meaning, but conclusions based on such resources may sometimes conflict.

== Genetic and neurocognitive research ==
According to several linguists, neurocognitive research has confirmed many standards of language learning, such as: "learning engages the entire person (cognitive, affective, and psychomotor domains), the human brain seeks patterns in its searching for meaning, emotions affect all aspects of learning, retention and recall, past experience always affects new learning, the brain's working memory has a limited capacity, lecture usually results in the lowest degree of retention, rehearsal is essential for retention, practice [alone] does not make perfect, and each brain is unique" (Sousa, 2006, p. 274). In terms of genetics, the gene ROBO1 has been associated with phonological buffer integrity or length.

Genetic research has found two major factors predicting successful language acquisition and maintenance. These include inherited intelligence, and the lack of genetic anomalies that may cause speech pathologies, such as mutations in the FOXP2 gene which cause verbal dyspraxia. The role of inherited intelligence increases with age, accounting for 20% of IQ variation in infants, and for 60% in adults. It affects a vast variety of language-related abilities, from spatio-motor skills to writing fluency. There have been debates in linguistics, philosophy, psychology, and genetics, with some scholars arguing that language is fully or mostly innate, but the research evidence points to genetic factors only working in interaction with environmental ones.

Although it is difficult to determine without invasive measures which exact parts of the brain become most active and important for language acquisition, fMRI and PET technology has allowed for some conclusions to be made about where language may be centered. Kuniyoshi Sakai has proposed, based on several neuroimaging studies, that there may be a "grammar center" in the brain, whereby language is primarily processed in the left lateral premotor cortex (located near the pre central sulcus and the inferior frontal sulcus). Additionally, these studies have suggested that first language and second language acquisition may be represented differently in the cortex. In a study conducted by Newman et al., the relationship between cognitive neuroscience and language acquisition was compared through a standardized procedure involving native speakers of English and native Spanish speakers who all had a similar length of exposure to the English language (averaging about 26 years). It was concluded that the brain does in fact process languages differently, but rather than being related to proficiency levels, language processing relates more to the function of the brain itself.

During early infancy, language processing seems to occur over many areas in the brain. However, over time, it gradually becomes concentrated into two areas—Broca's area and Wernicke's area. Broca's area is in the left frontal cortex and is primarily involved in the production of the patterns in vocal and sign language. Wernicke's area is in the left temporal cortex and is primarily involved in language comprehension. The specialization of these language centers is so extensive that damage to them can result in aphasia.

== Language diversity ==
Kelly et al. (2015: 286) comment that "There is a dawning realization that the field of child language needs data from the broadest typological array of languages and language-learning environments." This realization is part of a broader recognition in psycholinguistics for the need to document diversity. Children's linguistic accomplishments are all the more impressive with recognition of the diversity that exists at every level of the language system. Different levels of grammar interact in language-specific ways so that differences in morphosyntax build on differences in prosody, which in turn reflect differences in conversational style. The diversity of adult languages results in diverse child language phenomena that challenge every acquisition theory.

One such challenge is to explain how children acquire complex vowels in Otomanguean and other languages. The complex vowels in these languages combine oral and laryngeal gestures produced with laryngeal constriction [ʔ] or laryngeal spreading [h]. The production of the laryngealized vowels is complicated by the production of tonal contrasts, which rely upon contrasts in vocal fold vibration. Otomanguean languages manage the conflict between tone and laryngeal gesture by timing the gesture at the start, middle or end of the vowel, e.g. ʔV, VʔV and Vʔ. The phonetic realization of laryngealized vowels gives rise to the question of whether children acquire laryngealized vowels as single phonemes or sequences of phonemes. The unit analysis enlarges the vowel inventory but simplifies the syllable inventory, while the sequence analysis simplifies the vowel inventory but complicates the syllable inventory. The Otomanguean languages exhibit language-specific differences in the types and timing of the laryngeal gestures, and thus children must learn the specific laryngeal gestures that contribute to the phonological contrasts in the adult language.

An acquisition challenge in morphosyntax is to explain how children acquire ergative grammatical structures. Ergative languages treat the subject of intransitive verbs like the object of transitive verbs at the level of morphology, syntax or both. At the level of morphology, ergative languages assign an ergative marker to the subject of transitive verbs. The ergative marking may be realized by case markers on nouns or agreement markers on verbs. At the level of syntax, ergative languages have syntactic operations that treat the subject of transitive verbs differently from the subject of intransitive verbs. Languages with ergative syntax like K'iche' may restrict the use of subject questions for transitive verbs but not intransitive verbs. The acquisition challenge that ergativity creates is to explain how children acquire the language-specific manifestations of morphological and syntactic ergativity in the adult languages. The Mayan language Mam has ergative agreement making on its transitive verbs but extends the ergative marking to both the subject of intransitive verbs and the object of transitive verbs yielding transitive verbs with two ergative agreement markers. The contexts for extended ergative marking differ in type and frequency between Mayan languages, but two-year-old children produce extended ergative marking equally proficiently despite vast differences in the frequency of extended ergative marking in the adult languages.

Children acquire language through exposure to a diverse variety of cultural practices. Local groups vary in size and mobility depending on their means of subsistence. Some cultures require men to marry women who speak another language. Their children may be exposed to their mother's language for several years before moving in with their father and learning his language. Language groups have diverse beliefs about when children say their first words and what words they say. Such beliefs shape the time when parents perceive that children understand language. In many cultures, children hear more speech directed to others than to themselves, yet children acquire language in all cultures.

Documenting the diversity of child languages is made more urgent by the rapid loss of languages around the world. It may not be possible to document child language in half of the world's languages by the end of this century. Documenting child language should be a part of every language documentation project, and has an important role to play in revitalizing local languages. Documenting child language preserves cultural modes of language transmission and can emphasize their significance throughout the language community.

== Artificial intelligence ==
Some algorithms for language acquisition are based on statistical machine translation. Language acquisition can be modeled as a machine learning process, which may be based on learning semantic parsers or grammar induction algorithms.

Neural language models trained to predict next word from preceding context have demonstrated substantial linguistic abilities, including the ability to recognize and generate complex grammatical structures. These advances have stimulated research into how such models acquire linguistic knowledge and what their learning processes and abilities might reveal about how humans acquire and process language.

== Prelingual deafness ==
Prelingual deafness is defined as hearing loss that occurred at birth or before an individual has learned to speak. In the United States, 2 to 3 out of every 1000 children are born deaf or hard of hearing. Even though it might be presumed that deaf children acquire language in different ways since they are not receiving the same auditory input as hearing children, many research findings indicate that deaf children acquire language in the same way that hearing children do and when given the proper language input, understand and express language just as well as their hearing peers. Babies who learn sign language produce signs or gestures that are more regular and more frequent than hearing babies acquiring spoken language. Just as hearing babies babble, deaf babies acquiring sign language will babble with their hands, otherwise known as manual babbling. Therefore, as many studies have shown, language acquisition by deaf children parallels the language acquisition of a spoken language by hearing children because humans are biologically equipped for language regardless of the modality.

=== Signed language acquisition ===
Deaf children's visual-manual language acquisition not only parallel spoken language acquisition but by the age of 30 months, most deaf children that were exposed to a visual language had a more advanced grasp with subject-pronoun copy rules than hearing children. Their vocabulary bank at the ages of 12–17 months exceed that of a hearing child's, though it does even out when they reach the two-word stage. The use of space for absent referents and the more complex handshapes in some signs prove to be difficult for children between 5 and 9 years of age because of motor development and the complexity of remembering the spatial use.

=== Cochlear implants ===
Other options besides sign language for kids with prelingual deafness include the use of hearing aids to strengthen remaining sensory cells or cochlear implants to stimulate the hearing nerve directly. Cochlear implants (often known simply as CIs) are hearing devices that are placed behind the ear and contain a receiver and electrodes which are placed under the skin and inside the cochlea. Despite these developments, there is still a risk that prelingually deaf children may not develop good speech and speech reception skills. Although cochlear implants produce sounds, they are unlike typical hearing and deaf and hard of hearing people must undergo intensive therapy in order to learn how to interpret these sounds. They must also learn how to speak given the range of hearing they may or may not have. However, deaf children of deaf parents tend to do better with language, even though they are isolated from sound and speech because their language uses a different mode of communication that is accessible to them: the visual modality of language.

Although cochlear implants were initially approved for adults, now there is pressure to implant children early in order to maximize auditory skills for mainstream learning which in turn has created controversy around the topic. Due to recent advances in technology, cochlear implants allow some deaf people to acquire some sense of hearing. There are interior and exposed exterior components that are surgically implanted. Those who receive cochlear implants earlier on in life show more improvement on speech comprehension and language. Spoken language development does vary widely for those with cochlear implants though due to a number of different factors including: age at implantation, frequency, quality and type of speech training. Some evidence suggests that speech processing occurs at a more rapid pace in some prelingually deaf children with cochlear implants than those with traditional hearing aids. However, cochlear implants may not always work.

Research shows that people develop better language with a cochlear implant when they have a solid first language to rely on to understand the second language they would be learning. In the case of prelingually deaf children with cochlear implants, a signed language, like American Sign Language would be an accessible language for them to learn to help support the use of the cochlear implant as they learn a spoken language as their L2. Without a solid, accessible first language, these children run the risk of language deprivation, especially in the case that a cochlear implant fails to work. They would have no access to sound, meaning no access to the spoken language they are supposed to be learning. If a signed language was not a strong language for them to use and neither was a spoken language, they now have no access to any language and run the risk of missing their critical period.

== See also ==
- Chunking
- Creole language
- Evolutionary linguistics
- Evolutionary psychology of language
- Fis phenomenon
- FOXP2
- Gestures in language acquisition
- Glossary of language education terms
- Identity and language learning
- KE family
- Language attrition
- Language transfer
- List of children's speech corpora
- List of language acquisition researchers
- Metalinguistic awareness
- Natural-language processing
- Non-native speech database
- Origin of language
- Passive speaker (language)
- Reading skills acquisition
- Second-language attrition
- Spoken language
