= Corpus manager =

Software for searching a text collection

A corpus manager (corpus browser or corpus query system) is a tool for multilingual corpus analysis, which allows effective searching in corpora.

A corpus manager usually represents a complex tool that allows one to perform searches for language forms or sequences. It may provide information about the context or allow the user to search by positional attributes, such as lemma, tag, etc. These are called concordances. Other features include the ability to search for collocations, frequency statistics as well as metadata information about the processed text. The narrower meaning of corpus manager refers only to the server side or the corpus query engine, whereas the client side is simply called the user interface.

A corpus manager can be software installed on a personal computer or it might be provided as a web service.

== List of corpus managers ==
- BNCweb – a web-based interface for the British National Corpus
- CQPweb - a web-based interface for the study of a large variety of corpora including the Spoken BNC2014
- BYU-BNC – a website that allows searches of the British National Corpora and others created at Brigham Young University
- Coma – a tool extension of the system EXMARaLDA for working with oral corpora on a computer
- NoSketch Engine – a free open-source corpus management system combining Manatee (back-end) and Bonito (web interface)
- KonText – an extended and modified web interface to NoSketch Engine (a Bonito replacement)
- Sketch Engine – text corpus management and analysis software with more than 500 corpora in 90+ languages
- Spoco
- WordSmith Tools – a software package primarily for linguists
