= WordSmith (software) =

Corpus linguistics software package

WordSmith Tools
- Developers: Mike Scott, Oxford University Press
- Release: 1996; 30 years ago
- Stable release: 8.0.0.62 / December 19, 2021; 4 years ago
- Operating system: Windows
- Type: Concordancer, Corpus manager
- License: Proprietary
- Website: lexically.net/wordsmith/

WordSmith Tools is a software package primarily for linguists, in particular for work in the field of corpus linguistics. It is a collection of modules for searching patterns in a language. The software handles many languages.

== Development and acquisition ==
The program suite was developed by the British linguist Mike Scott at the University of Liverpool and released as version 1.0 in 1996. It was based on MicroConcord co-developed by Mike Scott and Tim Johns, published by Oxford University Press in 1993. Versions 1.0 through 4.0 were sold exclusively by Oxford University Press, the current version 8.0 and previous versions are now also distributed by Lexical Analysis Software Limited. The software runs under Windows. WordSmith is a download-only product which is registered by entering a code costing 50 pounds sterling for a single user license. However, WordSmith 4.0 can now be downloaded and used free.

== Functionality and applications ==
The core areas of the software package includes three modules:

- Concord is used to create concordances, so all the hits from a search within a previously defined body text.
- WordList lists all the Words or on word forms that are included in the selected corpus and statistical data are different from the text corpus.
- KeyWord creates a list of all those words and word forms according to certain statistical criteria in the text corpus significantly occur rarely or frequently.

Each of the modules offers a number of other features in relation to the text corpus or text being analysed. Thus, for example, collocation and dispersion plots are computed with a concordance search. In addition, there are a number of additional modules that are useful for the preparation, clean-up and format the text corpus. WordSmith Tools can be used in 80 different languages. WordSmith Tools is - along with several other software products similar in nature - an internationally popular program for the work based on corpus-linguistic methodology. It is used by investigators in assorted fields as can be seen in the list below of works using the software.
