= English Phonetics and Phonology: A Practical Course =

Book by Peter Roach

English Phonetics and Phonology
- Author: Peter Roach
- Language: English
- Subject: phonology, phonetics
- Publisher: Cambridge University Press
- Publication date: 1983 (1st ed), 1991 (2nd ed), 2000 (3rd ed), 2009 (4th ed)
- Media type: Print (hardcover)
- Pages: 262 p. (Second édition, seventh printing 1996)
- ISBN: 9780521717403 for the fourth edition. ISBN 0-521-40718-4 for the second simple one and ISBN 0-521-40719-2 for the second with set of cassettes. ISBN 0-521-28252-7 for Student's Book, first ed. and ISBN 0-521-28253-5 for Tutor's Book first ed.

English Phonetics and Phonology is a book by Peter Roach in which the author provides an introduction to the phonological structure of the English language.

== Reception ==
The book was reviewed by Sean Bowerman and Tunku Mohani Mohtar.
