= Babbling =

Stage in child development and language acquisition

A babbling infant, age 2 months, making cooing sounds

A babbling infant, age 6 months, making ba and ma sounds

Babbling is a stage in child development and a state in language acquisition during which an infant appears to be experimenting with uttering articulate sounds, but does not yet produce any recognizable words. Babbling begins shortly after birth and progresses through several stages as the infant's repertoire of sounds expands and vocalizations become more speech-like. Infants typically begin to produce recognizable words when they are around 12 months of age, though babbling may continue for some time afterward.

Babbling can be seen as a precursor to language development or simply as vocal experimentation. The physical structures involved in babbling are still being developed in the first year of a child's life. This continued physical development is responsible for some of the changes in abilities and variations of sound babies can produce. Abnormal developments such as certain medical conditions, developmental delays, and hearing impairments may interfere with a child's ability to babble normally. Though there is still disagreement about the uniqueness of language to humans, babbling is not unique to the human species.

== Typical development ==
Babbling is a stage in language acquisition. Babbles are separated from language because they do not convey meaning or refer to anything specific like words do. Human infants are not necessarily excited or upset when babbling; they may also babble spontaneously and incessantly when they are emotionally calm.

The sounds of babbling are produced before an infant begins to construct recognizable words. This can be partly attributed to the immaturity of the vocal tract and neuromusculature at this age in life. Infants first begin vocalizing by crying, followed by cooing and then vocal play. These first forms of sound production are the easiest for children to use because they contain natural, reflexive, mostly vowel sounds.

Babbling usually occurs in all children acquiring language. Particularly it has been studied in English, Italian, Korean, French, Spanish, Japanese and Swedish. Infants across the world follow general trends in babbling tendencies. Differences that do appear are the result of the infants' sensitivity to the characteristics of the language(s) they are exposed to. Infants mimic the prosody of the language(s) they are exposed to. They use intonation patterns and timing that matches the characteristics of their parent language. Infants also babble using the consonants and vowels that occur most frequently in their parent language. Most babbling consists of a small number of sounds, which suggests the child is preparing the basic sounds necessary to speak the language to which they are exposed.

The consonants that babbling infants produce tend to be any of the following: /p, b, t, d, k, g, m, n, s, h, w, j/. The following consonants tend to be infrequently produced during phonological development: /f, v, θ, ð, ʃ, tʃ, l, r, ŋ/. The complexity of the sounds that infants produce makes them difficult to categorize, but the above rules tend to hold true regardless of the language to which children are exposed.

The sounds produced in babble have been categorised relative to their components. For example, babble may be broken down into syllables that contain a consonant and a vowel (CV syllables) and syllables that contain only a vowel sound (non-CV syllables). These components have been studied in relation to speech development in children, and have been found to relate to future speech outcomes.

If babbling occurs during the first year of life, it can typically be concluded that the child is developing speech normally. As babies grow and change, their vocalizations will change as well.

=== Timeline of typical vocal development ===
Infants follow a general timeline of vocal developments in childhood. This timeline provides a general outline of expected developments from birth to age one. Babbling usually lasts 6–9 months in total. The babbling period ends at around 12 months because it is the age when first words usually occur. However, individual children can show large variability, and this timeline is only a guideline.

From birth to 1 month, babies produce mainly pleasure sounds, cries for assistance, and responses to the human voice.

Around 2 months, babies can distinguish between different speech sounds, and can make "goo"ing sounds.

Around 3 months, babies begin making elongated vowel sounds "oooo" "aaaa", and will respond vocally to speech of others. They continue to make predominantly vowel sounds.

Around 4 months, babies may vary their pitch, and imitate tones in adult speech.

Around 5 months, babies continue to experiment with sound, imitating some sounds made by adults.

Around 6 months, babies vary volume, pitch and rate. When infants are 6 months old they are finally able to control the opening and closing of the vocal tract, and upon obtaining this ability, infants begin to distinguish between the different sounds of vowels and consonants. This age is often distinguished as the beginning of the canonical stage. During the canonical stage, the babbling involves reduplicated sounds containing alternations of vowels and consonants, for example, "baba" or "bobo". Reduplicated babbling (also known as canonical babbling) consists of repeated syllables consisting of consonant and a vowel such as "da da da da" or "ma ma ma ma".

Around 7 months, babies can produce several sounds in one breath, and they also recognize different tones and inflections in other speakers.

Around 8 months, babies can repeat emphasized syllables. They imitate gestures and tonal quality of adult speech. They also produce variegated babbling. Variegated babbles contain mixes of consonant vowel combinations such as "ka da by ba mi doy doy". Variegated babbling differs from reduplicated babbling in terms of the variation and complexity of syllables that are produced.

Around 9–10 months, babies can imitate non speech sounds, and speech-like sounds if they are in the child's repertoire of sounds. Infant babbling begins to resemble the native language of a child. The final stage is known as conversational babbling, or the "jargon stage". Usually occurring by about ten months of age, the jargon stage is defined as "pre-linguistic vocalizations in which infants use adult-like stress and intonation". The general structure of the syllables that they are producing is very closely related to the sounds of their native language and this form of babbling significantly predicts the form of early words.

Around 11 months, babies imitate inflections, rhythms, and expressions of speakers.

By 12 months, babies typically can speak one or more words. These words now refer to the entity which they name; they are used to gain attention or for a specific purpose. Children continue to produce jargon babbles beyond their first words.

=== Manual babbling ===
Manual babbling is structurally identical to vocal babbling in its development. Just as hearing or speaking infants babble with their mouths, infants who grow up with a sign language babble with their hands. If a hearing infant has deaf or mute parents or parents who otherwise use a sign language, they will still imitate the signs that they see their parents displaying. This is evidence that manual babbling is possible in both hearing and deaf infants, and in both speaking and mute infants.

All babies imitate with their hands the movements that they see. Typical gestures for example are raising arms to be lifted up, or grabbing/reaching to indicate wanting a bottle; these are used referentially. In addition, infants who grow up with a sign language begin to make gestures that are distinct from all other hand movements and gestures.

After it was established that infants could babble with their hands and their mouths, the patterns in which productions occurred were studied. Speaking and signing infants follow very similar maturational paths in language acquisition. Both go through a number of stages, and exhibit similar complexity in their babbling sequences. In studies where deaf and hearing children were compared, children learning sign language produced more multi-movement manual babbling than children who were not learning a sign language. There are three main components of manual babbling. The hand gestures contain a restricted set of phonetic units, show a syllabic organization, and are used without reference or meaning. This is comparable to aspects of vocal babbling as mentioned above. It is difficult to study manual babbling as often the manual activity can be mistaken as gestures rather than signs. When signing children are in fact babbling it will most often take place in front of their torso in a designated area that is called the phonetic space. One of the most common forms of manual babbling is the extension and spreading of all fingers. This babble is also one of the first indicators that an infant will begin to make in manual communication.

Children are able to produce signs correctly, which is important since many articulation tendencies of manual babbling transfer to the children's early sign production. Children acquire signs for the same concepts as speaking children's words, and in the same stage of development.

== Transition from babbling to language ==
Two hypotheses have been devised in order to explain how babbling is related to language development.

- Discontinuity hypothesis – This early hypothesis suggests that babbling has absolutely no relationship to language development. If true, infants would produce a full range of random sounds in no particular order during the babbling stage. However, it has been demonstrated that early babbling is quite limited. Supporters of this hypothesis also thought that children might drop certain sounds only to pick them up again in later months. Supporters proposed it would be possible for babies to incorrectly and inconsistently use sounds that they had already mastered in the early babbling stages later in life or even lose sounds altogether before learning how to speak. The hypothesis also implies that when children finally reach the age where they are able to learn their native language, they develop phonological sounds in an orderly manner. Over time, infants will relearn sounds and develop words in a specific language. Current evidence does not support these claims.

Contemporary research supports the notion that babbling is directly related to the development of language as discussed in The Continuity Hypothesis.

- Continuity hypothesis – According to this hypothesis, babbling is a direct forerunner to language. At first, infants produce universal sounds that exist in all areas of the world and in all languages. Reduplicated canonical babbling produces a number of sounds but only some of them ("ma ma" and "da da", turning into "mommy" and "daddy", respectively) are recognized as meaningful and thus reinforced by caregivers and parents, while the others are abandoned as meaningless (this is the argument in, for instance, Susanne Langer's Philosophy in a New Key). This hypothesis agrees with the claim that the anatomical changes of the vocal tract are very important, but suggests that the social environment in which an infant is raised has a greater influence on the development of language. Infants pay close attention to their caregivers' reactions and use their feedback as approval for the sounds that they are making. This reinforcement through feedback helps infants to focus their attention on specific features of sound. Social feedback facilitates faster learning and earlier production of a variety of advanced words. There is evidence that babbling varies depending on the linguistic environment in which a baby is raised. Current babbling research supports The Continuity Hypothesis. For example, it has been noted that infants raised in French speaking environments display greater amounts of rising intonation in comparison to infants raised in English speaking environments. This is likely due to the differences between French and English intonations while speaking. The ordering of consonants and vowels in the babbling of English, French, Swedish and Japanese infants also appears to resemble that of their native language. These findings support another hypothesis, the "babbling drift hypothesis" in which infant babbling resembles the phonetic characteristics of a child's native language through exposure to speech. When babies are exposed to two languages, their babbles resemble the language that they are most exposed to. The dominant language is considered to be the one that children have the most exposure to. Most often infants do not produce a blend of language styles while babbling however, may switch between languages. Sometimes infants may choose which language style they prefer to babble in based upon particular features. The babbling drift hypothesis provides further support for The Continuity Hypothesis.

== Physiology of babbling ==
The human mouth moves in distinct ways during speech production. When producing each individual sound out loud, humans use different parts of their mouths, as well as different methods to produce particular sounds. During the beginnings of babbling, infants tend to have greater mouth openings on the right side. This finding suggests that babbling is controlled by the left hemisphere of the brain. The larynx, or voicebox, is originally high in the throat, it starts to descend during the first year of life, which then allows the pharynx to develop and facilitate the production of adult-like speech sounds.

Reduplicated babbling (such as 'bababa') involves a rhythmic opening and closing of the jaw. According to the frame dominance theory, when the mandible (jaw) is elevated, a consonant sound will be produced. When the mandible is lowered, a vowel-like sound is produced. Therefore, during a reduplicated sequence of sounds, the consonant and vowels are alternated as the mandible elevates and depresses. The opening and closing of the mouth alone will not produce babbling, and phonation (or voicing) is necessary during the movement in order to create a meaningful sound. Other important oral structures involved in articulation, such as the tongue, lips and teeth remain in a stable resting position during babbling. Sometimes during the babbling period, the motions can be made without any vocalization at all. Signing infants produce manual babbling through similar rhythmic alternations, but they perform with their hands instead of their mouths. As a baby goes beyond the reduplicated sequences of babbling, they exhibit equal sized mouth or hand openings on the right and left sides.

== Abnormal development ==
Typically by 6 months of age, all normally developing children will babble. However, infants with certain medical conditions or developmental delays may exhibit a delay or an absence of babbling. For example, infants who have had a tracheotomy typically do not babble because they are unable to phonate. Following decannulation, it has been found that these infants do produce more vocalizations, but the sounds or syllables are not as diverse as those found in typically developing infant's canonical babbling behaviour. Infants with severe apraxia may not babble, and may fail to produce first words. Communication by infants with apraxia may instead be in the form of grunting and pointing. Infants with autism may show a delay in babbling, and in some cases it may be completely absent. Babbling in children with autism tends to occur less frequently than in typically developing children, and with a smaller range of syllables produced during the canonical babbling stage. Babbling may also be delayed in individuals who are born with Down syndrome. The canonical stage may emerge two months later for individuals with Down syndrome compared to other infants, although, when produced, it is similar to babbling in typically developing infants.

=== Vocal babbling in deaf infants ===
Research has been conducted to determine whether or not infants with impaired hearing can demonstrate typical vocal sounds. Babbling can appear at the same age and in similar forms in hearing and deaf child, however, further continuation of babbling and speech development depends upon the ability for the child to hear themselves. For this reason, deaf children stop babbling vocally earlier than hearing children. Babbling should appear if the child is exposed to language, but vocal babbling can be delayed or non-existent for deaf children. It is not clear whether spoken language can develop fully without auditory experience. Deaf children are not only significantly delayed in spoken language development in comparison to their hearing counterparts, but they also produce fewer noises. This suggests that auditory experience is necessary in spoken language development. Some researchers have taken these findings as evidence against the hypothesis that language is an innate human capability.

A number of solutions have been used for hearing-impaired humans to gain auditory experience, one of which is hearing aids; they can be used to help infants reach babbling stages earlier. Cochlear implants have also been tested. Once the surgical implantation is complete, an infant has the opportunity to experience spoken language input. Once language has been heard, the infant begins to babble and speak in rhythmic patterns just as hearing infants do.

== Evidence across species ==
Though there is disagreement about the uniqueness of language to humans, babbling is not unique to the human species. Many animals produce similar ranges of sounds to human infants. These ranges of sounds are used in the young of many species to experiment with sound-making capabilities, or to practice for future vocal behavior. Similar to human infants, animal babbling is restricted by physiological development.

=== Songbirds ===
Not only are songbird and human language parallel regarding neural and molecular factors, they also are similar in how their communication is initially produced. Observations about these similarities can be traced back to Charles Darwin and his studies. Avian and mammalian brains are similar in form and connectivity and there may even be a gene that is relevant to speech found in both organisms. The learning of a song is produced through a mix of interaction, experience, and predisposition. Young songbirds will imitate their species' call when presented with songs from their own and another species. They are physically capable of producing either song, but do not. Humans learn language through similar means, which is why this early vocalization in songbirds is considered babbling.

Songbirds produce varieties of immature songs that are referred to as babbling because the immature songs precede those that are fully developed. As with humans, if these songs are reinforced with positive social feedback, they are more likely to recur. Other conspecifics provide feedback, especially the females in species for which only the males produce song. If females provide more social signals as feedback, males will develop more mature songs at a faster rate than other male birds. Young birds require reinforcement from adults in order to finalize their songs. Another relation to human infants is that the amount of vocalizations is not key, but rather the quality of the sounds that is retained and resembles the final produce of language.

The physiology of the animal is important. The properties of the ear and vocal tract, as well as the brain regions used in analyzing and processing information are critical determinants of how song is interpreted and later produced. In studies using isolated birds that have not had exposure to song, they produce an abnormal 'isolate song' that nevertheless contains species-specific aspects. This shows that the neural pathways have predetermined features that allow for such a phenomenon to occur. The pathways are able to allow for plasticity of the songs that can be learned in the future.

There is an important phase in development when song learning is best accomplished. This phase is called the 'sensitive period' and the amount of change that a songbird experiences in adulthood varies by species. Young birds have a production phase after a listening phase of development. The production of song is called 'subsong' where vocalizations resemble that of an adult as time passes. Memory for songs is able to form before the period where learning to sing occurs. Social interaction is important in vocal learning where non-singing females can even influence an infant through feedback.

=== Pygmy marmoset (Cebuella pygmaea) ===
Pygmy marmosets have been studied and found to produce complex vocalizations 2–3 weeks after birth. Both sexes are capable of creating calls at a rate of 3 calls/second and each bout of calls can last up to 6 or 7 minutes. A normal series of calls by a pygmy marmoset contains approximately 10 different call types. This variety of call forms produced by this creature is comparable to babbling in human infants for a number of reasons. Like reduplicative babbling in humans, the call is often repeated several times before a new sequence of sounds is produced. The vocalizations gain attention from caregivers and provide practice for future vocal behavior. For these reasons, pygmy marmoset calls are seen as babbling behavior.

There are a total of 16 call types in pygmy marmoset babbling language. Different calls serve different survival functions such as when desiring food, social interaction or during times of alarm. As human infants have, marmoset babies have higher rates of social interaction when producing babbling sounds. During the juvenile age, marmosets often regress back to babbling stages if a new infant is born. It is suggested that their production of babbling calls increases because they are seeking attention and social interaction. Another babbling occurrence during the juvenile age is the addition of territorial calls and mild threat vocalizations. Although babbling is important for practising adult calls during the juvenile age, babbling decreases with age in pygmy marmosets. Overall, babbling progresses through a series of stages from infancy to adulthood and slowly leads to the construction of adult calls.

=== Sac-winged bat (Saccopteryx bilineata) ===
Babbling-like behavior in songbirds, humans and some nonhuman primates has been previously researched, but it has not been researched until recently in non-primate mammals. The sac-winged bat (Saccopteryx bilineata) is a social creature and the vocalizations that it produces depend on the social situation that the animal is in. This bat has a large repertoire of vocalizations with males being more vocal than females. Echolocation pulses, barks, chatters, and screeches are used in various social situations including courtship and territorial defense. Infants produce isolation calls if their mothers are absent, but the pups also produce vocalizations that mirror those of adults. Both sexes of infants babble, even though as an adult, the vocalizations are solely produced by males. Social context, mothers, and surrounding bats do not influence pups because the multiple vocalizations are combined regardless of the situation. Since there is not a social aspect correlated with the vocalizations, the productions of the sounds suggest that the pups vocalize for training. The pups repeat and combine adult vocalizations so that they resemble babbling in what humans, other primates and some songbirds do as infants. However, while human babbling increases social interactions, there are no social responses to babbling in bats. Babbling is common in infants that have a large repertoire of adult vocalizations to learn and this is seen in the pups of sac-winged bat.

== See also ==
- Baby talk – Type of speech associated with an older person speaking to a child
- Crib talk – Monologue by toddlers before sleeping
- Critical period – Maturational stage in the lifespan of an organism
- Glossolalia – Phenomenon in which people speak words apparently in languages unknown to them
- Hypocorism – Affectionate nickname
- Mama and papa – In linguistics, a commonly seen sequence of sounds meaning "mother" and "father"
- Motor babbling – Speech of babbling from motor
