= Spoken English Corpus =

Speech corpus collection of British English recordings

The Spoken English Corpus (SEC) is a speech corpus collection of recordings of spoken British English compiled during 1984–1987. The corpus manual can be found on ICAME.

== History ==
The Spoken English Corpus (SEC) project was supported jointly in 1984-5 by the Humanities Research Fund at Lancaster University and by IBM (UK) Ltd, and subsequently by IBM UK Ltd. The project was supported by Geoffrey Leech at Lancaster and Geoffrey Kaye at IBM. The project was a collaboration, funded by IBM, between the Unit for Computer Research on the English Language (UCREL) at the University of Lancaster and the IBM Scientific Centre in Winchester.

== Compilation ==
SEC comprises 53 recorded passages, mainly from the BBC, spoken in the accent usually referred to as Received Pronunciation, or RP. The collection covers categories such as commentary, news broadcast, lecture, dialogue, poetry and propaganda. The corpus contains 52,637 words, totalling 339 minutes. The compilation of the corpus is described by Lita Taylor in her 1996 article "The Compilation of the Spoken English Corpus."

== Transcription ==
Knowles et al., (1996) A Corpus of Formal British English Speech, Routledge

A system was devised for transcription of the intonation of the material in the recordings. Two transcribers, Gerry Knowles and Briony Williams, both supported by Lita Taylor, analysed the entire corpus. The transcription system is explained by Williams, and an experiment was conducted by Brian Pickering to assess the degree of agreement between the two transcribers on a section of the Corpus containing around 1000 tone-units which was transcribed by both transcribers. Good agreement was found.

The whole transcription in print was made in its present form by Peter Alderson, who later took over as Speech Research Manager at IBM. The volume was later entitled "A Corpus of Formal British English Speech: The Lancaster/IBM Spoken English Corpus", and was first published by Longman in 1996, later by Routledge in 2013. The book is currently available from online bookstores including Routledge and Book Depository, or in electronic format from Google Play Books.

== Other analyses ==
Grammatical tagging of each word, based on the CLAWS1 tagset, was added to the text of the SEC by an automatic process. The fact that this tagging was in machine-readable form made it possible to relate grammatical and prosodic information in the texts. Subsequent work used probabilistic models to develop further the grammatical tagging and to produce automatic parsing techniques.

Anne Wichmann published her research on SEC intonation, "Intonation in Text and Discourse: Beginnings, middles, and ends" in 2000.

== Machine-Readable Spoken English Corpus (MARSEC) ==
Although the text and its associated tagging existed in machine-readable form, the recordings themselves existed only as tape-recordings. A collaboration, funded by the Economic and Social Research Council in 1992–4, between speech scientists at the Universities of Lancaster and Leeds in the United Kingdom set out to produce a version of the corpus which contained the recordings in digital form, time-linked to the text. The principal researchers were Gerry Knowles and Tamas Varadi (Lancaster) and Peter Roach and Simon Arnfield (Leeds). The outline of the project is set out in Knowles, and the automatic time-alignment is described by Roach and Arnfield. The digitized recordings were recorded on CD-ROM. It was subsequently made available for downloading for research purposes from Leeds University, though this facility is no longer supported.

== Aix-MARSEC ==
The work on MARSEC in Lancaster and Leeds finished around 1995, but the corpus has subsequently been the object of a considerable amount of further development at the University of Aix-en-Provence, France, under the direction of Daniel Hirst. The database consists of two major components: the digitalized recordings from MARSEC and the annotations. Annotations have so far been undertaken at nine levels, including phonemes, syllables, words, stress feet, rhythm units and minor and major turn units. Two supplementary levels, the grammatical annotation by CLAWS and a Property Grammar system developed at Aix-en-Provence, are to be integrated soon. A possible disadvantage of this treatment is that the corpus can only be searched using specially written scripts. The database, together with tools, is available under GNU GPL licensing at the Aix-MARSEC project site.
