= Non-native speech database =

Speech Database

A non-native speech database is a speech database of non-native pronunciations of English. Such databases are used in the development of: multilingual automatic speech recognition systems, text to speech systems, pronunciation trainers, and second language learning systems.

== List ==
Table 1: Abbreviations for languages used in Table 2

Arabic	A	Japanese	J
Chinese	C	Korean	K
Czech	Cze	Malaysian	M
Danish	D	Norwegian	N
Dutch	Dut	Portuguese	P
English	E	Russian	R
French	F	Spanish	S
German	G	Swedish	Swe
Greek	Gre	Thai	T
Indonesian	Ind	Vietnamese	V
Italian	I		

The actual table with information about the different databases is shown in Table 2.

Table 2: Overview of non-native Databases

Corpus	Author	Available at	Languages	#Speakers	Native Language	#Utt.	Duration	Date	Remarks
AMI		EU	E		Dut and other		100h		meeting recordings
ATR-Gruhn	Gruhn	ATR	E	96	C G F J Ind	15000		2004	proficiency rating
BAS Strange Corpus 1+10		ELRA	G	139	50 countries	7500		1998	
Berkeley Restaurant		ICSI	E	55	G I H C F S J	2500		1994	
Broadcast News		LDC	E					1997	
Cambridge-Witt	Witt	U. Cambridge	E	10	J I K S	1200		1999	
Cambridge-Ye	Ye	U. Cambridge	E	20	C	1600		2005	
Children News	Tomokiyo	CMU	E	62	J C	7500		2000	partly spontaneous
CLIPS-IMAG	Tan	CLIPS-IMAG	F	15	C V		6h	2006	
CLSU		LDC	E		22 countries	5000		2007	telephone, spontaneous
CMU		CMU	E	64	G	452	0.9h		not available
Cross Towns	Schaden	U. Bochum	E F G I Cze Dut	161	E F G I S	72000	133h	2006	city names
Duke-Arslan	Arslan	Duke University	E	93	15 countries	2200		1995	partly telephone speech
ERJ	Minematsu	U. Tokyo	E	200	J	68000		2002	proficiency rating
Fischer		LDC	E		many		200h		telephone speech
Fitt	Fitt	U. Edinburgh	F I N Gre	10	E	700		1995	city names
Fraenki		U. Erlangen	E	19	G	2148			
Hispanic	Byrne		E	22	S		20h	1998	partly spontaneous
HLTC		HKUST	E	44	C		3h	2010	available on request
IBM-Fischer		IBM	E	40	S F G I	2000		2002	digits
iCALL	Chen	I^{2}R, A*STAR	C	305	24 countries	90841	142h	2015	phonetic and tonal transcriptions (in Pinyin), proficiency ratings
ISLE	Atwell	EU/ELDA	E	46	G I	4000	18h	2000	
Jupiter	Zue	MIT	E	unknown	unknown	5146		1999	telephone speech
K-SEC	Rhee	SiTEC	E	unknown	K			2004	
LDC WSJ1		LDC		10		800	1h	1994	
LeaP	Gut	University of Münster	E G	127	41 different ones	73.941 words	12h	2003	
MIST		ELRA	E F G	75	Dut	2200		1996	
NATO HIWIRE		NATO	E	81	F Gre I S	8100		2007	clean speech
NATO M-ATC	Pigeon	NATO	E	622	F G I S	9833	17h	2007	heavy background noise
NATO N4		NATO	E	115	unknown		7.5h	2006	heavy background noise
Onomastica			D Dut E F G Gre I N P S Swe			(121000)		1995	only lexicon
PF-STAR		U. Erlangen	E	57	G	4627	3.4h	2005	children speech
Sunstar		EU	E	100	G S I P D	40000		1992	parliament speech
TC-STAR	Heuvel	ELDA	E S	unknown	EU countries		13h	2006	multiple data sets
TED	Lamel	ELDA	E	40(188)	many		10h(47h)	1994	eurospeech 93
TLTS		DARPA	A		E		1h	2004	
Tokyo-Kikuko		U. Tokyo	J	140	10 countries	35000		2004	proficiency rating
Verbmobil		U. Munich	E	44	G		1.5h	1994	very spontaneous
VODIS		EU	F G	178	F G	2500		1998	about car navigation
WP Arabic	Rocca	LDC	A	35	E	800	1h	2002	
WP Russian	Rocca	LDC	R	26	E	2500	2h	2003	
WP Spanish	Morgan	LDC	S		E			2006	
WSJ Spoke			E	10	unknown	800		1993	

=== Legend ===
In the table of non-native databases some abbreviations for language names are used. They are listed in Table 1. Table 2 gives the following information about each corpus: The name of the corpus, the institution where the corpus can be obtained, or at least further information should be available, the language which was actually spoken by the speakers, the number of speakers, the native language of the speakers, the total amount of non-native utterances the corpus contains, the duration in hours of the non-native part, the date of the first public reference to this corpus, some free text highlighting special aspects of this database and a reference to another publication. The reference in the last field is in most cases to the paper which is especially devoted to describe this corpus by the original collectors. In some cases it was not possible to identify such a paper. In these cases a paper is referenced which is using this corpus is.

Some entries are left blank and others are marked with unknown. The difference here is that blank entries refer to attributes where the value is just not known. Unknown entries, however, indicate that no information about this attribute is available in the database itself. As an example, in the Jupiter weather database no information about the origin of the speakers is given. Therefore this data would be less useful for verifying accent detection or similar issues.

Where possible, the name is a standard name of the corpus, for some of the smaller corpora, however, there was no established name and hence an identifier had to be created. In such cases, a combination of the institution and the collector of the database is used.

In the case where the databases contain native and non-native speech, only attributes of the non-native part of the corpus are listed. Most of the corpora are collections of read speech. If the corpus instead consists either partly or completely of spontaneous utterances, this is mentioned in the Specials column.
