= Language exposure for deaf children =

Language exposure for children is the act of making language readily available and accessible during the critical period for language acquisition. Early exposure to language enables the brain to develop cognitive function more fully and facilitates the development of language skills that support language fluency and comprehension later in life. Children who are d/Deaf and hard of hearing, compared to their hearing peers, tend to face barriers in developing language. Consequently, deaf and hard of hearing children are more likely to experience language deprivation, which may lead to cognitive delays and additional negative impacts on their health. However, research has guided the development of strategies to enhance language development and reduce deprivation. Examining language acquisition in deaf and hard of hearing children has resulted in more substantial evidence regarding the risks and benefits of early language exposure. Much of this research focuses on children in the United States, which limits its generalizability.

== Critical period ==
The critical period for first language acquisition is a linguistic theory that suggests there is a specific window of time when a language can be acquired. After this period, it becomes significantly more challenging to develop a first or second language. Many theories exist regarding the exact timing of the critical period for language acquisition; however, research indicates that when a child does not receive language exposure during their first few years of life, they may experience long-term language development deficits.

Much of the research on language exposure, the critical period, and language acquisition is based on spoken languages and hearing children. In reality, these same ideas also apply to deaf and hard of hearing children. For hearing children, first language exposure often begins with their parents' native language. The same is true for deaf and hard of hearing children with Deaf parents; they are exposed to sign language at birth.

However, language exposure for deaf and hard of hearing children born to hearing parents is often delayed. Early in life, deaf and hard of hearing children are typically primarily exposed to spoken language, as their parents may not have learned sign language. Consequently, deaf individuals often do not encounter sign language until later in childhood or even adulthood, regardless of their success in spoken languages. Research concludes that it is not hearing loss itself that affects language impairment, but rather a lack of sufficient language input during the first year of life. Children who are exposed to language during their first year of life typically exhibit normal language development, even if they later develop hearing loss.

== Early hearing detection and intervention (EHDI) ==
Currently, within the United States, newborn hearing screening practices are in place that inform parents of their newborn's hearing status within the first few weeks of the child's life. The HRSA-funded Early Hearing Detection and Intervention (EHDI) protocol adheres to a 1-3-6 rule: an infant should have their hearing screened by one month of age, diagnosed by three months, and enrolled in early intervention services by six months. Programs in the United States are divided into states and territories, and aim to screen, provide diagnoses, develop family support systems, and coordinate services for deaf and hard of hearing children to achieve language milestones. Data is collected from these programs to assess the success of screening and intervention programs in the hopes of optimizing care for deaf and hard of hearing children.

== Diagnosis ==
Approximately 90–95% of deaf and hard of hearing children are born to hearing parents, while 5–10% are born to Deaf parents. After an infant is born, they undergo a hearing screening using an auditory brainstem response (ABR). This test involves placing electrodes on the infant’s head to present pure tones and observe the resulting electrical activity in the brain. In the event that the infant fails the newborn hearing screening, a follow-up screening appointment will be scheduled. Should the infant also fail the second screening, it is essential to schedule a consultation with an audiologist to determine the next steps. If the audiologist diagnoses the infant with hearing loss, they will typically refer the child to an Ear, Nose, and Throat (ENT) specialist, specifically a pediatric otologist. This specialist focuses on ear conditions to help ensure that the baby develops language skills effectively. However, some physicians report that they are not confident in informing parents of deaf and hard of hearing children about additional steps to take beyond visiting an audiologist.

== Later language ability ==
There has been additional research on fluent sign language users and their ability to acquire spoken language later in life. Both signed and spoken language establish a strong foundation in the general language abilities, needed for reading, learning and basic expressive and receptive language skills. If language is acquired after the critical period for language acquisition, this foundation is not established.

Additionally, research indicates that children who learn sign and spoken language during the critical period of language acquisition develop comparably to bilingual children.

== Benefits of language exposure ==
Sign languages such as American Sign Language have been recognized as official languages following research that began in the 1960s. Research has established that signed languages encompass the same linguistic complexity as spoken languages, with intricate structures, syntax, and grammar that are comparable to those found in spoken languages. Furthermore, they both utilize the same regions in the left hemisphere of the brain for planning and processing language.

Both deaf children and hearing children with proper language exposure and education have normal cognitive development. In fact, deaf children and hearing children have similar language milestones and timelines. According to language development and milestone sources, babies who can hear and are exposed to language typically start to babble (e.g., ma-ma, da-da) between the ages of six and twelve months. Similarly, deaf babies that are exposed to a signed language will start to "babble" with their hands by using organized and repetitive elements of their signed language.

In keeping with this, deaf, hard of hearing, and hearing children have equal potential to develop typical cognitive abilities; deafness does not directly cause any cognitive impairments or language delays. However, deaf and hard of hearing children are at much higher risk for having inadequate exposure to language during their critical periods which can in turn cause cognitive and language delays.

== Language development ==
For children who can hear and speak, first language exposure usually starts with their parents' native language. There are two primary approaches proposed for exposing deaf and hard of hearing children to language. The first is through sign language, and the second is through spoken language. However, it is not necessary to choose one or the other. Research indicates that learning two languages, regardless of the specific languages themselves, can offer unique cognitive benefits. For deaf and hard of hearing children in particular, learning both a signed language from birth and spoken/written language can protect the child from the harms that come from language deprivation, which occurs when a child is delayed in accessing language in any modality. This suggests that learning two languages, irrespective of the languages themselves, can provide distinct cognitive advantages to bilingual individuals. Furthermore, bilingualism opens up more opportunities for the individual by enabling them to interact with users of multiple languages.

=== Sign language ===
When deaf children are born to Deaf parents who use sign language, their language exposure is constant and fully accessible from birth. This is equivalent to the quality of language exposure received by hearing children. These children thus demonstrate typical language acquisition. However, most deaf and hard of hearing children have hearing parents with little to no experience in sign language. There are many options available to these parents to help them provide their child with as much fully accessible language as possible from birth onward.

Sign languages may differ by country, and even by region. Support from academic institutions such as Gallaudet University has led to global efforts to establish an international signing community through student exchanges. Many of these programs offer volunteer opportunities to improve language exposure for children in countries where sign language is not formally integrated into their primary school curriculum.

=== Cochlear implants and exposure ===
Many doctors recommend that families with babies diagnosed with hearing loss see an audiologist. To some, an audiologist referral is an attempt to solve a problem of hearing loss. To others, it is seen as an act of denying the baby a chance to explore and become a part of the Deaf community. Since their introduction, there has been a heated debate over research on cochlear implants. This surgery is a common recommendation for children born deaf, in an attempt to help the child hear, understand, and use spoken language, alongside or in addition to sign language.

The debate primarily centers on the view that deafness is a problem that needs to be addressed, a phenomenon referred to as deficit framing, which may include terminology such as "hearing-impaired." Many proud members of the Deaf community view the implantation as trying to fix someone who is already whole, and may find this insulting and even unethical. Others view it as a very real possibility to open doors and give children the opportunity to function with more accessibility in a hearing society.

In 2018, a systematic review of all the literature on cochlear implants and language acquisition outcomes was published, which concluded that it is unlikely for most deaf children to catch up to their hearing peers in spoken language acquisition through the use of cochlear implants. However, language outcomes were better when the child received access to language (in this case, spoken language through implants) at an earlier age. One solution that has been proposed to address this issue is to provide exposure to sign language for all deaf children as early as possible, regardless of plans for pursuing cochlear implants or hearing aids later on. This strategy ensures the maximum possible language exposure for children. It mitigates the risk of language deprivation often associated with waiting to see if cochlear implants will be successful for any given child.

== Parent Resources ==
Most deaf and hard of hearing children have hearing parents with little to no experience in sign language. There are many options available to these parents to help them provide their child with as much fully accessible language as possible from birth onward.

First, many schools for the deaf offer sign language classes to parents who want to learn to sign with their child. Some schools even offer parent–infant programs, which allow parents to bring their infants to the class. These programs offer both language instruction to parents and sign language exposure to infants, as well as structured playtime that allows parents and infants to interact in sign language with signing instructors present to facilitate and answer questions.

For toddlers and preschoolers, signing preschool classes are often offered at schools for the deaf. These are places where deaf and hard of hearing children can spend the school day in language-rich classrooms that may provide more fluent sign language exposure than many hearing parents are able to provide. Additionally, these preschools provide deaf and hard of hearing children with the much needed chance to start building peer relationships with others who share their language.

Some states in the U.S. have established mentorship programs for families with new deaf or hard of hearing children to assist them during their baby's first year of life. By connecting hearing parents with a Deaf role model, these programs allow parents to glimpse the wonderful adults their child can become, get connected with the Deaf community, and empower them to locate and access other available resources (such as the resources mentioned in this section).

== Risks of language deprivation ==
Children who are deaf and hard of hearing (DHH) are at elevated risk for language deprivation when they do not receive early exposure to an accessible language such as American Sign Language (ASL). Language deprivation itself has been associated with poorer health outcomes in deaf and hard of hearing adults, which may lead to chronic health conditions in adulthood. These conditions include an increased risk for diabetes, heart disease, and hypertension.

Limited early language access is associated with social isolation, communicative difficulty, and reduced opportunities for emotional learning through interaction. Prolonged exclusion from communication can trigger psychological and physiological stress responses, including increases in heart rate, muscle tension, and sweating. Language deprivation during childhood disrupts access to the communicative experiences that are essential for social interaction, cognitive growth, and emotional development.

== Education ==
It is essential for deaf and hard of hearing children to have unrestricted access to language in the classroom. The accommodations needed for these children will look different depending on whether they were raised using spoken or sign language. These accommodations provide the child with access to social and academic communication vital for academic success. There are three primary ways deaf and hard of hearing children are educated: listening and spoken language, mainstream, and schools for the deaf.

=== Education in Listening and Spoken Language ===
Deaf education programs that use spoken language as their instructional language modality rely on hearing assistive technologies (HAT) to amplify sound and increase auditory access in the classroom. HAT helps reduce complications with noise, reverberation, and distance. A child’s hearing aid or cochlear implant will wirelessly connect to a microphone worn by the teacher through frequency modulation (FM) or digital wireless systems.

Listening can be physically and cognitively demanding for deaf and hard of hearing students, despite the availability of these technological supports. The effort of deciphering speech can become mentally fatiguing and create stress. Prolonged fatigue can impair a student's ability to process auditory information, negatively affecting their learning. Classroom noise increases these challenges, making educational environments particularly exhausting for students who are deaf or hard of hearing. Small group work can be especially difficult, as overlapping conversations are difficult to follow.

=== Mainstream ===
Many parents believe that mainstreaming their child provides the best opportunity for success in education and the development of social skills. Moreover, removing the labels of 'deaf' and 'hard of hearing' will facilitate a smoother integration process into the hearing world. These children often possess strong language and auditory speech perception skills, enabling them to accurately recognize words even in the presence of background noise, which contributes to their success in mainstream settings.

Despite these potential benefits, mainstream classrooms also present significant challenges. For example, the teacher may forget to charge the HAT microphone or fail to wear it. If students sit in the front row, they may hear the teacher more clearly. However, they might struggle to listen to classmates speaking from behind or across the classroom. Additionally, teachers must receive proper training to effectively support the learning needs of deaf and hard of hearing students.

In addition to acoustic challenges, deaf and hard of hearing students in mainstream settings may be educationally stigmatized. Educators may engage in self-fulfilling prophecies, lowering academic expectations and unintentionally limiting students’ academic potential. These barriers further restrict education in spoken language based environments.

Another important consideration is in relation to sign language interpreters. The effectiveness of accommodating a deaf or hard of hearing student with a sign language interpreter depends on the student's language status. Students who are deaf or hard of hearing and experience language deprivation are less likely to benefit from interpreters compared to their peers with minimal or no language deprivation. Students who depend solely on their interpreter for language input will gain significantly less linguistic benefit than those who engage with a variety of language partners in the classroom.

=== Schools for the Deaf ===
While schools in the United States that teach primarily in American Sign Language are rare compared to mainstream public schools, each state typically has at least one. A few examples of schools for the Deaf that use signed language as their instructional modality include The Learning Center for the Deaf, the Maryland School for the Deaf, and the Texas School for the Deaf, among others. Other schools for the deaf often employ a total communication approach using a sign language system referred to as simultaneous communication.

Enrolling a child in a Deaf educational institution immerses the child in a shared cultural and linguistic community, eliminating the exclusion and isolation often associated with mainstreaming. Students can access information independently because the school is designed for deaf and hard of hearing individuals. The classroom typically arranges desks in a U shape to facilitate visual access among students and the teacher. On-site audiologists are available to address amplification needs, and speech pathologists experienced with deaf children are proficient in ASL, enabling them to support speech development in their natural language. Research indicates that incorporating sign language and the Deaf community can improve a child's self esteem, identity, social connections, and overall quality of life.

== Legislation initiatives ==
=== Americans with Disabilities Act ===
In the United States of America, the Americans with Disabilities Act (ADA) and the Individuals with Disabilities Education Act (IDEA) states that a public education should be provided to each child with a disability in the "least restrictive environment" for them. As a broad statement, this is up to interpretation. Often this means that children with hearing loss get access to public schools with an interpreter.

=== LEAD-K ===
LEAD-K stands for Language Equality and Acquisition for Deaf Kids. LEAD-K is an American campaign promoting language acquisition and kindergarten readiness for Deaf and hard of hearing children ages 0–5. LEAD-K recognizes that Deaf children may struggle academically when entering school due to inadequate language exposure in their early stages of life. The LEAD-K organization has developed model legislation to promote the success of Deaf and hard of hearing children through required assessments ensuring that certain language milestones are met. The assessments may be conducted in ASL and/or written/spoken English.

State	Legislation	Status
CA	SB 210	Passed in 2015
HI	Act 177	Established in 2016
KS	SB 323	Passed in 2016
SD	HB 1228	Passed in 2020
GA	HB 844	Passed in 2018
LA	HB 199	Passed in 2018
MI	HB 5777	Passed in 2022
RI	SB 2825	Rejected in 2016
MI	HB 6005	Rejected in 2016
NH	HB 554	Rejected in 2017
WV	HB 2571	Rejected in 2017
MO	HB 481	Rejected in 2017
AL	HB 253	Rejected in 2018
TX	*	Statewide report in 2022*

LEAD-K hopes that the data that would be collected from assessments proposed by their bills will be used to hold state education systems accountable if their deaf and hard of hearing students appear to be falling behind on the milestones they should be meeting. The intention of LEAD-K is to advocate for early language exposure and steady language progress for all children. Reaching the right language milestones on a consistent timeline can help deaf and hard of hearing children maintain a healthy developmental path. Support for LEAD-K initiatives has primarily come from organizations that support Deaf activism, such as the National Association of the Deaf and the National Black Deaf Advocates, both of which have led campaigns to raise awareness. Opposition to LEAD-K initiatives from advocates for spoken language communication for deaf children and adults, including the Alexander Graham Bell Association, the American Speech-Language Association, and the American Cochlear Implant Alliance.

=== Language milestones ===
Language development milestones have been established in some states to enshrine legislative support for child development through language exposure. In California, SB 210 outlines goals for the first five years of a child's life, focusing on receptive language, vocabulary, and expressive language. Similarly, Montana Code §52-2-904 also outlines specific language milestones for deaf and hard of hearing children, with examples in both ASL and spoken english.
