= Genie (feral child) =

American feral child (born 1957)

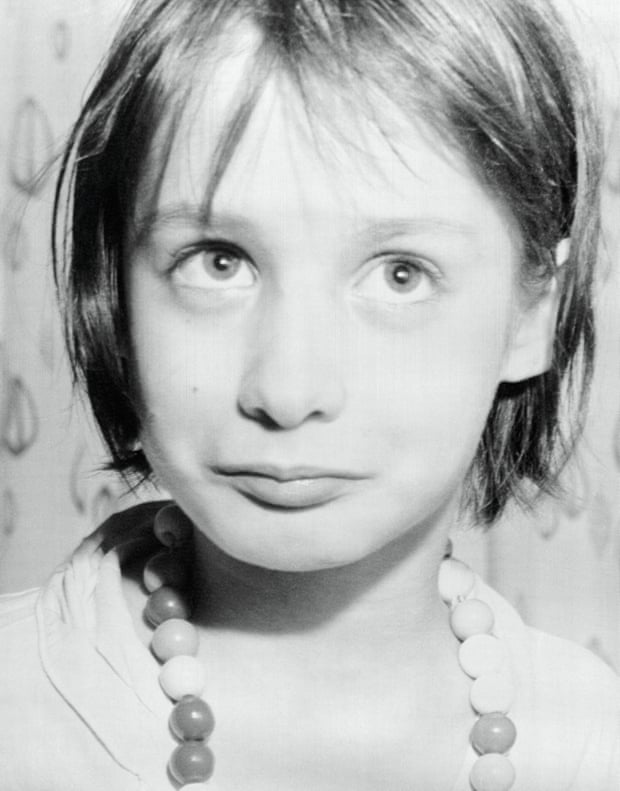
- The first publicly released picture of Genie, taken in 1970, just after authorities took control of her care at the age of 13
- Born: 1957 (age 68–69); Arcadia, California, U.S.
- Known for: Being the victim of severe child abuse and a research subject in language acquisition

Genie (born 1957) is the pseudonym of an American feral child who was a victim of severe abuse, neglect, and social isolation. Her circumstances are prominently recorded in the annals of linguistics and abnormal child psychology. When she was approximately 20 months old, her father began keeping her in a locked room. During this period, he almost always strapped her to a child's toilet or bound her in a crib with her arms and legs immobilized, forbade anyone to interact with her, provided her with almost no stimulation of any kind, and left her severely malnourished. The extent of her isolation prevented her from being exposed to any significant amount of speech, and as a result she did not acquire language during her childhood. Her abuse came to the attention of Los Angeles County child welfare authorities in November 1970, when she was 13 years and 7 months old, after which she became a ward of the state of California.

Psychologists, linguists, and other scientists almost immediately focused a great deal of attention on Genie's case. Upon determining that she had not yet learned language, linguists saw her as providing an opportunity to gain further insight into the processes controlling language acquisition skills and to test theories and hypotheses identifying critical periods during which humans learn to understand and use language. Throughout the time scientists studied Genie, she made substantial advances in her overall mental and psychological development. Within months, she developed exceptional nonverbal communication skills and gradually learned some basic social skills, but even by the end of their case study, she still exhibited many behavioral traits characteristic of an unsocialized person. She also continued to learn and use new language skills throughout the time they tested her, but ultimately remained unable to fully acquire a first language.

Authorities initially arranged for Genie's admission to the Children's Hospital Los Angeles, where a team of physicians and psychologists managed her care for several months. Her subsequent living arrangements became the subject of rancorous debate. In June 1971, she left the hospital to live with her teacher, but one and a half months later, authorities placed her with the family of the scientist heading the research team, with whom she lived for almost four years. Soon after turning 18, she returned to live with her mother, who decided after a few months that she could not adequately care for her. At her mother's request, authorities moved Genie into the first of what would become a series of institutions and foster homes for disabled adults. The people running these facilities isolated her from almost everyone she knew and subjected her to extreme physical and emotional abuse. As a result, her physical and mental health severely deteriorated, and her newly acquired language and behavioral skills very rapidly regressed.

In early January 1978, Genie's mother abruptly forbade all scientific observations and testing of her. Little is known about her circumstances since then. Her current whereabouts are uncertain, although, as of 2016, she was believed to be living in the care of the state of California. Psychologists and linguists continue to discuss her, and there is considerable academic and media interest in her development and the research team's methods. In particular, scientists have compared her to Victor of Aveyron, a 19th-century French child who was also the subject of a case study in delayed psychological development and late language acquisition.

== Family background ==
Genie was the last, and second surviving, of four children born to parents living in Arcadia, California. Her father worked in a factory as a flight mechanic during World War II and continued in aviation afterward, and her mother, who was around 20 years younger and from an Oklahoma farming family, had come to Southern California as a teenager with family friends who were fleeing the Dust Bowl. As a young child, Genie's mother sustained a severe head injury in an accident, giving her lingering neurological damage that caused degenerative vision problems in one eye. Genie's father mostly grew up in orphanages in the American Pacific Northwest. His father was killed by a lightning strike, and his mother ran a brothel while infrequently seeing him. Additionally, his mother gave him a feminine first name, which made him the target of constant derision. As a result, he harbored extreme resentment toward his mother during childhood, which Genie's brother and the scientists who studied Genie believed was the cause of his subsequent anger problems.

When Genie's father reached adulthood, he changed his first name to one that was more typically masculine, and his mother began to spend as much time with him as she could. He became almost singularly fixated on his mother, despite having relentless arguments over her attempts to convince him to adopt a less rigid lifestyle, and therefore came to treat all other relationships as secondary at best. Although Genie's parents initially seemed happy to those who knew them, soon after they married, he prevented his wife from leaving home and beat her with increasing frequency and severity. Her eyesight steadily deteriorated as a result of lingering effects from her existing neurological damage, the onset of severe cataracts, and a detached retina in one eye, leaving her progressively more dependent on him.

Genie's father disliked children and wanted none of his own, finding them noisy; however, around five years into their marriage, his wife became pregnant. He beat her throughout the pregnancy, and near the end, attempted to strangle her to death; she was in the hospital recovering from this when she gave birth to an apparently healthy daughter. Her father found her crying disturbing and placed her in the garage, where she caught pneumonia and died at the age of ten weeks. Their second child, born approximately a year later, was a boy diagnosed with Rh incompatibility who died at two days of age; accounts vary as to whether his death was the result of complications of Rh incompatibility or from choking on his own mucus. Three years later, they had another son, who doctors described as healthy despite also having Rh incompatibility. His father forced his wife to keep him quiet, causing significant physical and linguistic developmental delays. When he reached the age of four, his paternal grandmother grew concerned about his development and took over his care for several months, and he made good progress with her before she eventually returned him to his parents.

== Early life ==
Genie was born about five years after her brother, around the time her father began to isolate himself and his family from all other people. Her birth was a standard Caesarean section with no noted complications, and she was in the 50th percentile for weight. The following day, she showed signs of Rh incompatibility and required a blood transfusion, but had no sequelae and was otherwise described as healthy. A medical appointment at three months showed that she was gaining weight normally but found a congenital hip dislocation, which required her to wear a highly restrictive Frejka splint from the age of 4 1/2 to 11 months. This caused her to be late to walk, which researchers believed led her father to start speculating that she was mentally retarded. He therefore made a concerted effort not to talk to or pay attention to her, and strongly discouraged her mother and brother from doing so as well.

There is little information about Genie's early life, but available records indicate that for her first months she displayed relatively normal development. Her mother later recalled that she was not a cuddly baby, did not babble much, and resisted solid food. At times she claimed that at an unspecified point Genie spoke individual words, though she could not recall them, but at other times she said that Genie had never produced any speech. Researchers never determined which was the truth.

At the age of 11 months, Genie was still in overall good health and had no noted mental abnormalities, but had fallen to the 11th percentile for weight. The researchers who later studied her believed this was a sign that she was starting to suffer some degree of malnutrition. When she was 14 months old, she came down with a fever and pneumonitis, and her parents took her to a pediatrician who had not previously seen her. The pediatrician said that, although her illness prevented a definitive diagnosis, there was a possibility that she was mentally retarded and that the brain dysfunction kernicterus might be present, further amplifying her father's conclusion that she was severely retarded.

Six months later, when Genie was 20 months old, her paternal grandmother was killed in a hit and run traffic accident. Her death affected Genie's father far beyond normal levels of grief, and because his son had been walking with her, he held him responsible, further heightening his anger. When the driver received only a probationary sentence for both manslaughter and drunk driving, Genie's father became delusional with rage. Scientists believed these events made him feel society had failed him and convinced him he would need to protect his family from the outside world, but that in doing so he lacked the self-awareness to recognize the destruction his actions caused. Because he believed Genie was severely retarded, he thought she needed him to protect her even further, and therefore decided to hide her existence as much as possible. He immediately quit his job and moved his family into his mother's two-bedroom house, where he demanded her car and bedroom be left completely untouched as shrines to her, and further isolated his family.

=== Childhood ===
Upon moving, Genie's father increasingly confined Genie to the second bedroom in the back of the house while the rest of the family slept in the living room. During the daytime, for approximately 13 hours, he tied her to a child's toilet in a makeshift harness which he forced her mother to make. It was designed to function as a straitjacket, and while in it she wore nothing but a diaper and could only move her extremities. At night, he usually tied her into a sleeping bag and placed her in a crib with a metal screen cover, keeping her arms and legs immobilized, and researchers believed that he sometimes left her on the child's toilet overnight. When the family first moved into the house, he occasionally allowed Genie to be in the backyard inside a small playpen, but she reportedly angered him by breaking it down to get out; the people who later worked with her interpreted this to mean she was left alone and unsupervised in it for extended periods of time. He soon decided not to allow her outside at all, and kept her entirely confined to the bedroom.

Researchers concluded that if Genie vocalized or made any other noise, her father would beat her with a large plank that he kept in her room. To keep her quiet, he bared his teeth and growled like a dog at her, and he grew his fingernails out to scratch her. If he suspected her of doing something he did not like, he made these noises outside the door and beat her if he believed she had continued to do it, instilling in her an intense and persistent fear of cats and dogs. No one definitively discerned the exact reason for his dog-like behavior, although at least one scientist speculated he may have viewed himself as a guard dog and was acting out the role. As a result, she learned to make as little sound as possible and to otherwise give no outward expressions. She developed a tendency to masturbate in socially inappropriate contexts, leading doctors to consider the possibility that her father had sexually abused her or forced her brother to do so, although they never uncovered definite evidence.

Genie's father fed her as little as possible and refused to give her solid food, feeding her only baby food, cereal, Pablum, an occasional soft-boiled egg, and liquids. He, or when coerced, her brother, spooned food into her mouth as quickly as possible, and if she choked or could not swallow fast enough the person feeding her rubbed her face in her food. These were normally the only times he allowed her mother to be with her, although he did not allow her to feed Genie herself. She claimed her husband always fed Genie three times a day but also said that she sometimes risked a beating by making noise when hungry, leading researchers to believe he often refused to feed her. In early 1972, her mother told researchers that, whenever possible, at around 11:00 at night she would surreptitiously try to give her additional food, causing Genie to develop an abnormal sleep pattern in which she slept from 7 to 11 pm, woke up for a few minutes, and fell back asleep for an additional 6 1/2 hours. This sleep pattern continued for several months after she began to receive medical attention, and only gradually normalized.

Genie's father had an extremely low tolerance for any noise, to the point of refusing to have a working television or radio in the house. He seldom allowed her mother or brother to talk and viciously beat them if they did so without permission, particularly forbidding them to speak to or around her. Therefore, any conversation between them was very quiet and out of her earshot, preventing her from hearing any meaningful amount of language. Genie's father kept her room extremely dark, and the only available stimuli were the crib, the child's toilet, curtains on each of the windows, three pieces of furniture, and two plastic raincoats hanging on the closet door. On rare occasions he allowed her to play with plastic food containers, old spools of thread, TV Guide issues with many of the illustrations cut out, and the raincoats. The room had two almost entirely blacked-out windows, one which he left slightly open; although the house was well away from the street and other houses, she could see the side of one neighboring house and a few inches of sky, and occasionally heard environmental sounds or a neighboring child practicing the piano.

Throughout this time, Genie's father almost never permitted anyone else to leave the house, only allowing her brother to go to and from school and requiring him to prove his identity through various means before entering, and to discourage disobedience he frequently sat in the living room with a shotgun in his lap. He did not allow anyone else in or near the house, turned on the outside lights all night to discourage anyone from approaching, and kept his gun nearby in case someone did come. According to a neighbor, no one in the neighborhood knew about the abuse Genie's father carried out on his family or was aware that her parents ever had a child besides her brother. Throughout this time, her father kept detailed notes chronicling his mistreatment of his family and his efforts to conceal it. (Note: In her dissertation on Genie, Susan Curtiss alluded to knowledge of additional details regarding Genie's childhood, which she did not discuss.)

Genie's mother was passive by nature and was almost completely blind throughout this time. Her husband continued to beat her and threatened to kill her if she attempted to contact her parents, any of her close friends who lived nearby, or the police. He also prevented his son from seeking help and beat him with increasing frequency and severity; as he got older, his father forced him to carry out more abuse of Genie. He tried several times to run away. Genie's father was convinced that she would die by age 12 and promised that, if she survived past that age, he would allow her mother to seek outside assistance for her, but he reneged when Genie turned 12; her mother took no action for another year and a half.

=== Rescue ===
In October 1970, when Genie was approximately 13 years and 6 months old, her parents had a violent argument in which her mother threatened to walk out if she could not call her own parents. Her husband eventually relented, and later that day she left with Genie when he was out of the house to go to her parents' house in Monterey Park, California; Genie's brother, by then 18, had already run away from home and was living with friends in the area. Around three weeks later, on November 4, their mother decided to apply for disability benefits for the blind in nearby Temple City, California, and brought Genie with her, but on account of her near-blindness she accidentally entered the general social services office next door. The social worker who greeted them instantly sensed something was wrong when she saw Genie, and was shocked to learn her true age, having estimated from her appearance and demeanor that she was around six or seven and possibly autistic, and after she and her supervisor questioned Genie's mother and confirmed Genie's age they immediately contacted police. Her parents were arrested and she became a ward of the court; because of her physical condition and near-total unsocialized state, a court order was immediately issued for her to be taken to the Children's Hospital Los Angeles.

Upon Genie's admission to the hospital, David Rigler, a University of Southern California psychology professor who was the chief psychologist at the hospital, and Howard Hansen, then the head of the psychiatry division and an early expert on child abuse, took direct control of Genie's care. The following day, they assigned physician James Kent, another early advocate for child abuse awareness, to conduct the first examinations of her. Most of the information doctors received on Genie's early life came from the police investigation into her parents. Even after its conclusion, there were many unresolved questions about her childhood that subsequent research never answered.

News of Genie reached major media outlets on November 17, receiving a great deal of local and national attention, and the one photograph authorities released of her significantly fueled public interest. Although her father refused to speak to police or the media, large crowds subsequently went to try to see him, which he reportedly found extremely difficult to handle. On November 20, the morning before a scheduled court appearance on child abuse charges, he committed suicide by gunshot. Police found two suicide notes, one intended for his son, which in part said, "Be a good boy, I love you," and one directed at police. One note—sources conflict as to which—contained the declaration, "The world will never understand."

After Genie's father committed suicide, authorities and hospital staff exclusively focused on Genie and her mother; years later, her brother said their mother soon began dedicating all of her love and attention to Genie, after which he left the Los Angeles area. At the request of Hansen, attorney John Miner, an acquaintance of his, represented Genie's mother in court. She told the court that the beatings from her husband and her near-total blindness had left her unable to protect herself or her children. Charges against her were dropped, and she received counseling from the hospital; Hansen was her therapist's direct supervisor.

=== Characteristics and personality ===
Genie in the hospital yard a few weeks after her admission, displaying her characteristic "bunny walk"

Kent stated that his initial examinations of Genie revealed by far the most severe case of child abuse he would ever encounter, and he came away extremely pessimistic about her prognosis. She was extremely pale and grossly malnourished, standing 4 ft 6 in (1.37 m) tall and weighing only 59 pounds (27 kg), with two nearly full sets of teeth in her mouth, and had a distended abdomen. The restraining harness her father used had caused a thick callus and heavy black bruising to form in a ring on her buttocks, which took several weeks to heal. A series of X-rays found that she had moderate coxa valga in both hips and an undersized rib cage, and her bone age was that of an 11-year-old. Despite early tests confirming she had normal vision in both eyes, she could not focus them on anything more than 10 feet (3 m) away, corresponding to the dimensions of the room her father kept her in.

Genie's gross motor skills were extremely weak; she could neither stand up straight nor fully straighten any of her limbs, and she had very little endurance. Her movements were very hesitant and unsteady, and she had a characteristic "bunny walk", in which she held her hands in front of her like claws while ambulating, which suggested extreme difficulty with sensory processing and an inability to integrate visual and tactile information. Kent was somewhat surprised to find her fine motor skills were significantly better, determining they were at approximately the level of a two-year-old. She could not chew and had severe dysphagia—totally incapable of swallowing solid or even soft food, and barely able to do so with liquids. When eating, she held anything she could not swallow in her mouth until her saliva broke it down, and if this took too long she spat it out and mashed it with her fingers. She was also completely incontinent, and did not respond to extreme temperatures.

Doctors found it very difficult to test or estimate Genie's mental age or assess any of her cognitive abilities, but on two attempts they found she scored at the level of a 13-month-old. To the surprise of doctors she was intensely interested in exploring new environmental stimuli, although objects seemed to intrigue her much more than people. She seemed especially curious about unfamiliar sounds, and Kent noted that she very intently searched for their sources. Doctors noticed her extreme fear of cats and dogs early during her stay, but initially thought this was due to her being incapable of rational thinking; they did not discern its actual origin until years later.

From the start, Genie showed interest in many hospital staff members, often approaching and walking with complete strangers, but Kent said she did not seem to distinguish between people and showed no signs of attachment to anybody, including her mother and brother. At first she would not allow anyone to touch her, quickly shying away from any physical contact, and while she sat on her mother's lap when requested she remained very tense and got up as quickly as possible; hospital staff wrote that her mother seemed entirely oblivious to her emotions and actions. Her behavior was typically highly antisocial and proved extremely difficult for others to control. Regardless of where she was, she constantly salivated and spat, and continually sniffed and blew her nose on anything that happened to be nearby. She had no sense of personal property, frequently pointing to or taking something she wanted from someone else, or situational awareness. Doctors wrote that she acted on impulse irrespective of the setting, especially noting that she frequently engaged in open masturbation and sometimes attempted to involve older men in it.

Genie initially showed a small amount of responsiveness to nonverbal information, including gestures and facial expressions from other people, and made reasonably good eye contact. However, her own demeanor was completely devoid of any facial expressions or discernible body language, and she could only nonverbally get across a few very basic needs. She clearly distinguished speaking from other sounds but remained almost completely silent and unresponsive to speech, and any responses she gave were to accompanying nonverbal signals. When upset, she would wildly attack herself, and while doing so she remained completely expressionless and never cried or vocalized; some accounts said she could not cry at all. To make noise, she would push chairs or other similar objects. Her outbursts initially occurred very often and had no discernible trigger—Kent wrote that she never tried to indicate the source of her anger—and continued until someone diverted her attention or she physically tired herself out, at which point she would again become silent and non-expressive.

Linguists later discerned that, in January 1971, Genie's receptive vocabulary only consisted of her own name, the names of a few other familiar people, and about 15–20 individual words for names of objects, and her active vocabulary consisted of two phrases: "stop it" and "no more", both of which she treated as individual words. They could not determine the extent of her receptive or active vocabulary at any point before January 1971, and therefore did not know whether she had acquired any or all of this language during the preceding two months. After observing her for some time they concluded that she was not selectively mute, and tests found no physiological or psychological explanation for her lack of language. Because her existing medical records also contained no clear indications of mental disabilities, researchers determined that her extreme isolation and lack of exposure to language during childhood had prevented her from acquiring a first language.

==== Preliminary assessment ====
Within a month after Genie's admission to the hospital, Jay Shurley, a professor of psychiatry and behavioral sciences at the University of Oklahoma and a specialist in extreme social isolation, took an interest in her case. Shurley noted at the time that Genie was by far the most severe case of isolation he had ever studied or heard about, which he maintained more than 20 years later. Over the next year and a half he came on three three-day visits to conduct daily observations and to carry out a sleep study, hoping to determine if Genie was autistic, whether she had sustained any brain damage, and whether she was born mentally retarded. Shurley concluded she was not autistic, with which other doctors who worked with her during that time and later researchers concurred; he noted that she had a high level of emotional disturbance, but wrote that her eagerness for new stimuli and lack of behavioral defense mechanisms were uncharacteristic of autism. (Note: Psychologist and autism specialist Mitzi Waltz noted in 2013 that, although psychologist Ole Ivar Lovaas was conducting autism research at UCLA during the time of Genie's case, no one who worked with her attempted to involve him or sought his opinion on whether she was autistic. Years after the case study on her ended, when somebody asked Susan Curtiss why they had not done so, she said that she and the other scientists thought Lovaas' methods of aversion therapy would have unduly limited Genie's freedom and kept her from experiencing the nurturing environment doctors and scientists sought for her.)

Shurley found no signs of brain damage but observed a few persistent abnormalities in Genie's sleep, including a significantly reduced amount of REM sleep with a much larger than average variance in duration, and an unusually high number of sleep spindles (bursts of rhythmic or repetitive neural activity). He eventually concluded she had been mentally retarded from birth and specifically cited her significantly elevated number of sleep spindles, as these are characteristic of people born severely retarded. The other scientists following the case remained divided on this issue. Much later, for example, Susan Curtiss emphatically argued that, although Genie clearly had serious emotional difficulties, she could not have been retarded. She pointed out that Genie made a year's developmental progress for every calendar year after her rescue, which would not be expected if her condition was congenital, and that some aspects of language she acquired were very unusual in the speech of mentally retarded people. Curtiss instead maintained that she was born with at least average intelligence and that the abuse and isolation of her childhood had left her functionally retarded.

== Hospital stay ==
In his first meeting with Genie, James Kent initially observed no reactions from her, but eventually drew a small amount of nonverbal and verbal responsiveness with a small puppet. Playing with this and similar puppets quickly became her favorite activity, and apart from her tantrums accounted for most of the few times she expressed any emotion during the early part of her stay. Within a few days she started learning to dress herself and began voluntarily using the toilet, but she continued to have nighttime and daytime incontinence which only slowly improved. Kent quickly realized there would be a large number of people working with her, and was concerned that she would not learn to form a normal relationship unless somebody was a steady presence in her life, so he decided to accompany her on walks and to all of her appointments.

Genie quickly began growing and putting on weight, and steadily became more confident in her movements. By December, she had good eye–hand coordination and was much better at focusing her eyes. Soon after her admission she developed a sense of possession; for reasons doctors did not determine she would hoard objects to which she took a liking, and became extremely upset if someone touched or moved anything she collected. She took all kinds of items but particularly sought colorful plastic objects, which doctors speculated was due to these having been the items she had access to as a child. Though she generally did not seem to care whether plastic items were toys or ordinary containers, she especially sought out beach pails. During the first few months of her stay, giving her one of these objects could bring her out of a tantrum.

After a few weeks, Genie became much more responsive to other people, and shortly afterward began paying attention to people speaking, but at first she remained mostly unexpressive and it was unclear whether she was responding to verbal or nonverbal stimuli. A month into her stay, she started becoming sociable with familiar adults, first with Kent and soon after with other hospital staff. She was clearly glad when someone she knew visited and sometimes worked very hard to get a person to stay, expressing disappointment if she failed; for no discernible reason, her greetings were far more energetic than the relatively mild unhappiness she expressed when people left. After the state dropped charges against her mother, she began visiting Genie twice a week, and over the course of a few months they steadily grew better at interacting with each other.

Around the same time, doctors noted that Genie took pleasure in intentionally dropping or destroying small objects and enjoyed watching someone else do the same to something she had been playing with. Kent wrote that she did the same series of actions several times over and that it appeared to ease some internal tension for her, and therefore thought she did this to gain control of traumatic childhood experiences. She also showed a deep fascination with classical piano music played in front of her, which researchers believed was because she could hear some piano music during her childhood. She did not have the same reaction to recordings, and if someone played anything other than classical music she would change the sheet music to a book which she knew had music she liked; her music preferences and their intensity persisted after her stay at the hospital.

By December 1970, Kent and the other hospital staff working with Genie saw her as a potential case study subject. That month, David Rigler obtained a small grant from the National Institute of Mental Health (NIMH) to do preliminary studies on her and began organizing a research team to submit a larger request. In January 1971, doctors administered a Gesell Developmental Evaluation and found her to be at the developmental level of a 1-to-3-year-old, noting she already showed substantial developmental disparities. The following month psychologists Jack Block and Jeanne Block evaluated her, and found her scores ranged from below a 2-to-3-year-old level, to, on a few components, a normal 12-to-13-year-old level. Around the same time, doctors noted that she was very interested in people speaking and that she attempted to mimic some speech sounds.

By April and May 1971, Genie's scores on the Leiter International Performance Scale tests had dramatically increased, with her overall mental age at the level of a typical 4-year-9-month-old, but on individual components she still showed a very high level of scatter. Her progress with language accelerated, and doctors noticed that the words she used indicated a fairly advanced mental categorization of objects and situations and focused on objective properties to a degree not normally found in children. Around that time, when a minor earthquake struck Los Angeles, she ran frightened into the kitchen and rapidly verbalized to some of the cooks she had befriended, marking the first time she sought out comfort from another person and the first time she was so readily verbal. However, she still had a hard time being with large crowds of people; at her birthday party, she became so anxious at all the guests present that she had to go outside with Rigler to calm down.

During the later part of Genie's stay at the hospital, she also started engaging in physical play with adults, and eventually began to enjoy giving and receiving hugs. She continued to exhibit frustration and have tantrums, but in response to situations that would have elicited similar reactions in most young children, and she could sulk for a long time despite receiving an object she liked. In April 1971, to the great surprise of doctors, she began attacking another girl because she felt she owned the hospital dress the other girl had on. This was the first time she showed a sense of possession over items she thought belonged to her but was otherwise impartial towards, and marked the first time she directed her anger outwards, although she did not entirely stop harming herself when upset.

=== Brain testing ===
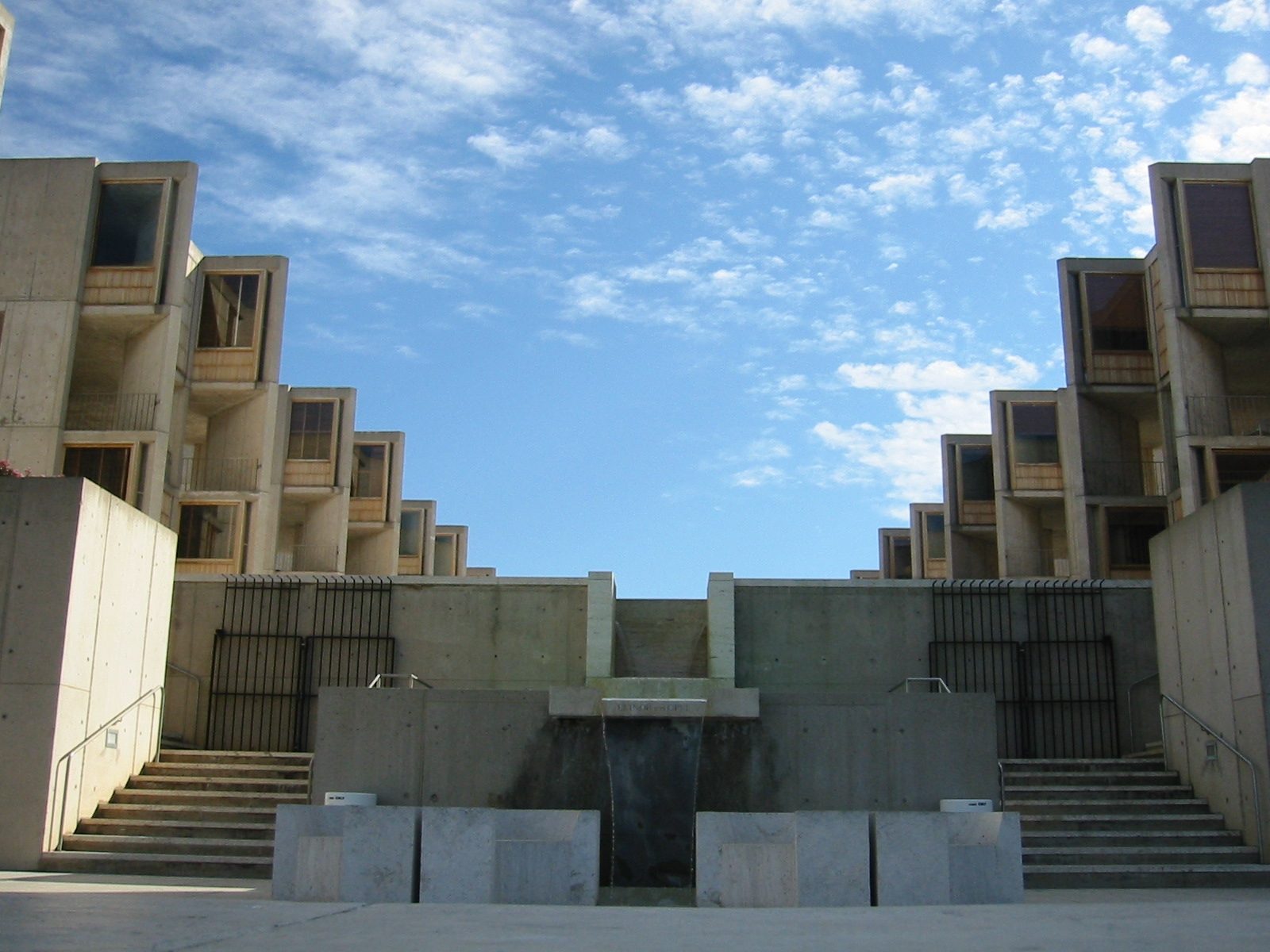
The Salk Institute for Biological Studies, where researchers analyzed the data from the first of several brain exams on Genie

Beginning in January 1971, scientists conducted a series of neurolinguistic tests on Genie to determine and monitor the course and extent of her mental development, making her the first language-deprived child to undergo any detailed study of her brain. They determined her brain was intact, and Shurley's sleep-studies found sleep patterns typical of a left-hemisphere dominant person, leading scientists to believe she was most likely right-handed. Over the following years multiple tests of her handedness supported this conclusion, as did observations of her in everyday situations. Based on their early tests, doctors suspected her brain was extremely right-hemisphere dominant.

In early March of that year, neuroscientists Ursula Bellugi and Edward Klima came from the Salk Institute for Biological Studies to administer their own series of brain exams on Genie. Audiometry tests confirmed that she had normal hearing in both ears, but on a series of dichotic listening tests Bellugi and Klima found that she identified language sounds with 100% accuracy in her left ear while correctly answering at only a chance level in her right ear. Such extreme asymmetry on these tests had previously only been documented in patients with either split-brain or who had undergone a hemispherectomy as an adult. When they gave her monaural tests for both language and non-language sounds she answered with 100% accuracy in both ears, which was normal. On non-language dichotic listening tests she showed a slight preference for identifying non-language sounds in her left one, which was typical for a right-handed person and helped rule out the possibility of her brain only being reversed in dominance for language.

Based on these results, Bellugi and Klima believed that Genie had been developing as a typical right-handed person until the time her father began isolating her. They attributed the extreme imbalance between her hemispheres to the fact that her sensory input as a child was almost exclusively visual and tactile, stimulating functions which are predominantly controlled in the right hemisphere of a right-handed person, and although this input had been extremely minimal, it was sufficient to cause their lateralization to her right hemisphere. Because she did not have significant linguistic input during her childhood, they concluded her left hemisphere underwent no specialization whatsoever so her language functions never lateralized to it. Since she accurately distinguished speech sounds with her right hemisphere, they thought her language functions had lateralized there instead.

=== Interest as a case study and grant funding ===
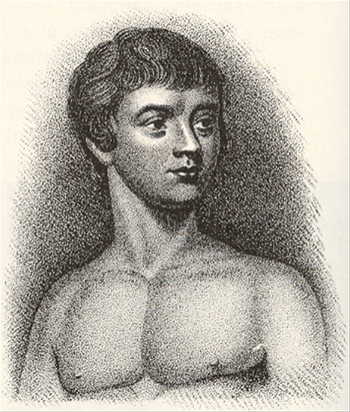
A lithograph of Victor of Aveyron c. 1800

At the time of Genie's admission to the hospital, there was wide discussion in both lay and academic circles about the hypotheses of Noam Chomsky, who had first suggested that language was innate to humans and distinguishes humans from all other animals, and Eric Lenneberg, who in 1967 hypothesized that humans have a critical period for language acquisition and defined its end as the onset of puberty. Despite the interest in these hypotheses, prior to Genie's discovery there had been no way to test them. Though ancient and medieval texts made several references to language deprivation experiments modern researchers labeled such ideas "The Forbidden Experiment", impossible to carry out for ethical reasons. Coincidentally, the François Truffaut film The Wild Child, which chronicled the life of Victor of Aveyron in the years immediately after his discovery and the efforts of Jean Marc Gaspard Itard to teach him language and integrate him into society, also premiered in the United States only a week after Genie's rescue. The major success of the film further heightened public interest in cases of children subjected to extreme abuse or isolation.

Prompted by this coincidence of timing, David Rigler led a team of scientists who sought and obtained a three-year grant from the NIMH to study Genie in May 1971. At the suggestion of Jean Butler, her special education teacher at the hospital, they screened The Wild Child during their first meeting, and the scientists later said this had an immediate and profound impact on all of them. The huge variety of suggestions for how to work with her made it extremely difficult for researchers to give the proposal a coherent direction. To the surprise of several scientists involved in the grant meetings, Rigler decided the primary focus of the study would be to test Chomsky and Lenneberg's hypotheses and selected UCLA linguistics professor Victoria Fromkin to head linguistic evaluation. (Note: Lenneberg stated that he did not have any desire to study Genie and declined to participate, saying no definite conclusions could be drawn because the level of trauma associated with Genie's childhood would be impossible to discern.) The research team also planned to continue periodic evaluations of Genie's psychological development in various aspects of her life. From the time of her admission to the hospital researchers had tried to keep her identity concealed, and it was around this time that they adopted the pseudonym Genie for her, referencing similarities between a genie coming out of a lamp without having a childhood and her sudden emergence into society past childhood.

=== Early research ===
Soon after the NIMH accepted the grant proposal, in late May 1971, Susan Curtiss began her work on Genie's case as a graduate student in linguistics under Victoria Fromkin, and for the remainder of her stay at the hospital Curtiss met with her almost every day. Curtiss quickly recognized Genie's powerful nonverbal communication abilities, writing that complete strangers would frequently buy something for her because they sensed she wanted it and that these gifts were always the types of objects she most enjoyed. Curtiss concluded that Genie had learned a significant amount of language but that it was not yet at a usefully testable level, so she decided to dedicate the next few months to getting to know her and gaining her friendship. Over the following month, they very quickly bonded with each other.

At around the same time Curtiss began her work, doctors reevaluated Genie on the Leiter scale and measured her on the Stanford–Binet Intelligence Scale, which placed her estimated mental age between a 5- and 8-year-old with a very high degree of scatter. This represented substantial progress, although it was far lower than her actual age at the time. On the other hand, scientists reported that she had an extraordinary ability to gestalt numbers; when asked to get a certain number of objects, or to tell how many of a given object there were in a group, up to the number seven she could accurately respond faster than the scientists could count with 100% accuracy. Child psychologist David Elkind, who was involved in the grant meetings, evaluated her in May 1971 and reported that she was in the concrete operational stage of development, noting that she understood object permanence (Note: The concept that refers to the ability to understand that objects continue to exist even when out of sight.) and could engage in deferred imitation of non-language activity. (Note: A term in child's developmental psychology which refers to remembering and imitating someone else's behavior a while after, and not immediately after, observing it.) Her physical health also continued to improve, and by this time her endurance had dramatically increased. Her social behavior was still highly abnormal, and doctors were especially concerned that she almost never interacted with people in her age group, but evaluations from the time expressed some optimism about her prognosis.

== First foster home ==
In June 1971, Jean Butler, Genie's special education teacher, obtained permission to take Genie on day trips to her home in Country Club Park, Los Angeles. Near the end of that month, after one of these trips, Butler told the hospital that she might have contracted rubella, to which Genie would have been exposed. Hospital staff were reluctant to give foster custody to her and were very skeptical of her story, strongly suspecting she had concocted it as part of a bid to take over as Genie's guardian and primary caretaker, but decided that placing her in an isolation ward at the hospital could potentially be highly damaging to her social and psychological development, so they agreed to temporarily quarantine her in Butler's home. Butler, who was childless, unmarried, and at the time living alone, subsequently petitioned for foster custody of Genie, and despite the hospital's objections, authorities extended her stay while they considered the matter.

=== Butler's observations ===
Soon after moving in with Butler, Genie started showing the first physical signs of reaching puberty, marking a dramatic improvement in her overall physical health and definitively putting her past Lenneberg's proposed critical period for language acquisition. Butler continued to observe and document Genie's hoarding, in particular noting that she collected and kept dozens of containers of liquid in her room. Although she could not discern the reason for Genie's intense fear of cats and dogs, after witnessing it firsthand Butler and the man she was dating—who was a retired University of Southern California professor and psychologist—tried to help her overcome it by watching episodes of the television series Lassie with her and giving her a battery-powered toy dog. Butler wrote that Genie could eventually tolerate fenced dogs, but that there was no progress with cats.

In her journal, Butler wrote that she had gotten Genie to stop attacking herself when angry and had taught her to instead express her anger through words or by hitting objects. Butler also claimed that, shortly after moving in with her, Genie had become noticeably more talkative and that she had made substantial progress with her language acquisition. In an early August letter to Jay Shurley, she wrote that the man she was dating had also noticed and commented on the improvement in her language. She also wrote that Genie's incontinence gradually improved until, by the end of her stay, it had almost entirely disappeared.

=== Custody dispute ===
Genie's mother continued to visit her and, around the time Genie moved in with Butler, received corrective cataract surgery which restored much of her vision. During Genie's stay, Butler had the man she was dating move in with her, believing that authorities would view her pending foster application more favorably if she offered a two-parent home. However, she began to strenuously resist visits from the researchers, whom she felt overtaxed Genie, and began disparagingly referring to them as the "Genie team", a nickname that stuck. Butler particularly seemed to dislike James Kent and Susan Curtiss, preventing both from visiting during the latter part of Genie's stay, and also had several disagreements with David Rigler, although he later said their disputes were never as personal or as heated as she portrayed them.

Researchers believed Butler had good intentions for Genie, but criticized her unwillingness to work with them and thought she negatively affected Genie's care and its study. They strongly contested her claims of pushing Genie too hard, contending that she enjoyed the tests and could take breaks at will, and both Curtiss and Kent emphatically denied her accusations towards them. The research team viewed her as personally troubled, noting her longstanding and widely known reputation for combativeness among coworkers and superiors. Several of the scientists, including Curtiss and Howard Hansen, recalled her openly stating that she hoped Genie would make her famous, and Curtiss especially remembered her repeatedly proclaiming her intent to be, "the next Anne Sullivan".

In mid-August, California authorities informed Butler they had rejected her application for foster custody. The extent, if any, to which the hospital influenced the decision is unclear. Rigler maintained several times that despite the scientists' objections neither the hospital nor any of its staff had intervened, and said the authorities' decision surprised him. The Nova documentary on Genie, however, states the rejection of Butler came partially on the hospital's recommendation; there is evidence many hospital authorities, including Hansen, felt her ability to care for Genie was inadequate, and hospital policy forbade its staff members from becoming foster parents of its patients. Butler herself believed the hospital had opposed her application so Genie could be moved somewhere more conducive to research, and wrote that Genie, upon being told of the decision, was extremely upset and had said, "No, no, no."

== Second foster home ==
Genie while working with Marilyn Rigler

In early August, Howard Hansen suggested to David Rigler that he take custody of Genie if authorities rejected Butler's application. Rigler initially balked at the idea but decided to talk it over with his wife, Marilyn, who had graduate training as a social worker and had just completed a graduate degree in human development, and had previously worked in nursery schools and Head Start Programs. They had three adolescent children of their own, which Shurley later said made them consider themselves more suitable guardians for Genie than Jean Butler. They ultimately decided that, if no one else would, they were willing to temporarily care for her until another suitable foster home became available. Rigler acknowledged the proposed arrangement would clearly put him in a dual relationship with her, but the hospital and authorities decided that, in the absence of other adequate options, they would consent to make the Riglers her temporary foster parents.

On the same day Genie went back to the hospital, the Riglers had her transferred to their home in Los Feliz. David said that he and Marilyn initially intended the arrangement to last for a maximum of three months, but she ultimately stayed with them for almost four years. When she moved in with them, Marilyn became her teacher, David decided to take over the role of her primary therapist, and James Kent and the research team immediately resumed observations and evaluations. They remained her primary caretakers throughout this time, but with the consent of her mother and psychologists, authorities designated John Miner as her uncompensated legal guardian in 1972.

=== Relationship with her mother ===
While Genie lived with the Riglers, her mother usually met with her once a week at a park or restaurant, and their relationship continued to grow stronger. Although the Riglers never expressed antipathy toward her mother, their efforts to be polite to her inadvertently came off as condescension. Years later, Marilyn also said she was uncomfortable acting as a mother to Genie in her house with Genie's real mother present. With the exception of Shurley, who later said he felt the other scientists did not treat Genie's real mother as an equal, her mother did not get along well with the researchers, some of whom resented her lack of action during Genie's childhood. The scientists speculated she gave them a mostly cool reception because they reminded her of her earlier inaction on behalf of her children, and David also thought she was in denial about Genie's condition and the hand she had had in causing it. Curtiss wrote that she often gave conflicting statements about her married life and Genie's childhood, seemingly saying what she thought people wanted to hear, which the research team believed was out of fear of reprobation or ostracism for telling the truth.

Butler, who married shortly after authorities removed Genie from her house and began using her married name, Ruch, stayed in touch with her mother. Although her mother later recalled that most of their conversations during this time were shallow in nature, they continued to get along very well. Throughout Genie's stay with the Riglers, Ruch persistently accused researchers of conducting harmful tests, deliberately forcing her mother out of her life, and misusing the available grant money, all of which the research team consistently and emphatically denied. Genie's mother steadily began listening more to Ruch, and eventually came to feel the research team was marginalizing her.

=== Research team testing and observations ===
==== Behavior ====
Without any obvious cause Genie's incontinence immediately resurfaced, and was especially severe for the first few weeks after she moved in but persisted at a lower level for several months. In contrast to Ruch's writings, the Riglers observed she still acted out her anger on herself and noted that certain situations in particular, such as spilling containers of liquid, sent her into tantrum behavior, which doctors attributed to her having been beaten for these actions as a child. They also wrote that she was extremely frightened of their dog, and upon seeing it for the first time she immediately ran and hid. The research team recorded her speech being much more halting and hesitant than Ruch had described, writing that she very rarely spoke and that, for the first three months of her stay, almost always did so in one-word utterances. Unless she saw something which frightened her, both her speech and behavior exhibited a great deal of latency, often several minutes delayed, for no clear reason, and she still had no reaction to temperature. She continued to have a very difficult time controlling her impulses, frequently engaging in highly anti-social and destructive behavior.

Shortly after Genie moved in, Marilyn taught her to direct her frustrations outward by generally "having a fit". Because Genie sought compliments on her appearance, Marilyn began to paint her fingernails and told her she did not look good when she scratched herself, and when situations came up which especially upset her, Marilyn tried to verbally de-escalate her. She gradually gained more control over her responses and with prompting could verbally express frustration, although she never entirely ceased to have tantrums or engage in self-harm. Later during her stay with the Riglers, on occasion she could indicate her level of anger through gestures; depending on whether she was very angry or merely frustrated, she either vigorously shook one finger or loosely waved her hand.

Although the scientists did not yet know the reason for Genie's fear of cats and dogs, the Riglers used their puppy in an effort to acclimate her. After approximately two weeks she entirely overcame her fear of their dog, but continued to be extremely afraid of unfamiliar cats and dogs. Marilyn worked with her to help overcome her ongoing difficulty with chewing and swallowing, which took approximately four months, although they noted that she disliked having to resort to the effort of chewing and therefore still preferred softer food whenever possible. She also tried to help her become more attuned to her body's sensations, and in late 1973 Curtiss recorded the first instance of her showing sensitivity to temperature. Although Curtiss and the Riglers noted that they had to constantly prompt her to engage in activities, throughout her stay her physical health substantially improved.

Genie was initially indifferent to other people and almost never acknowledged them, even when someone directly addressed her, and she frequently walked away after a short time. In an effort to get her to listen to other people Curtiss began reading children's stories to her, and at first she did not seem to engage, but one day in mid-October 1971 Curtiss saw that she was clearly listening and responding to her. After that, she paid attention to people even when they were not speaking directly to or about her. She became somewhat more sociable in her interactions with people and became somewhat more responsive, although she still frequently showed no obvious signs that she heard someone. Her reactions to most stimuli became more rapid, but even by the end of her stay she sometimes took several minutes before giving a response to somebody.

After several months living with the Riglers, Genie's behavior and social skills improved to the point that she started going to first a nursery school and then a public school for mentally retarded children. The Riglers also taught her some basic self-help skills, including simple chores such as ironing, using a sewing machine, and preparing simple meals for herself. She made substantial progress with controlling herself both at home and in public, and although it was extremely hard to prevent her socially inappropriate masturbation she had almost entirely ceased it by the end of her stay. In February 1973 Curtiss recorded the first time she shared something with her, and while she continued to take things from other people her reactions when other people saw her doing so clearly indicated that she knew she was not supposed to.

During the time Genie lived with the Riglers, everyone who worked with her reported that her mood significantly improved and she was clearly content with her life. As late as June 1975, David wrote that she continued to make significant strides in every field which the scientists were testing, and Curtiss's contemporaneous accounts expressed some optimism about her social development. Nonetheless, even by mid-1975 most social interactions with her remained abnormal in quality. The scientists wrote that, while her overall demeanor and interactions with others had significantly improved, many aspects of her behavior remained characteristic of an unsocialized person.

==== Language ====
Curtiss began thorough, active testing of Genie's language in October 1971, when she and Fromkin decided that her linguistic abilities were sufficient to yield usable results. Linguists designed their tests to measure both Genie's vocabulary and her acquisition of various aspects of grammar, including syntax, phonology, and morphology. They also continued to observe her in everyday conversations to gauge what pragmatics of language she acquired. The research team considered her language acquisition to be a substantial part of their larger goal of helping to integrate her into society, so although they wanted to observe what vocabulary and grammar she could learn on her own, out of a sense of obligation they sometimes stepped in to assist her.

Throughout linguists' testing, the size of Genie's vocabulary and the speed with which she expanded it continued to outstrip all anticipations. By mid-1975 she could accurately name most objects she encountered, and clearly knew more words than she regularly used in her speech. By contrast, she had far more difficulty with learning and using basic grammar. She clearly mastered certain principles of grammar, and her receptive comprehension consistently remained significantly ahead of her production, but the rate of her grammar acquisition was far slower than normal and resulted in an unusually large disparity between her mastery of vocabulary and grammar. In everyday conversations she typically spoke only in short utterances and inconsistently used what grammar she knew, although her use of grammar remained significantly better in imitation, and her conversational competence markedly improved during her stay but remained very low, which the scientists found unsurprising and suggested was evidence that the ability to engage in conversation was a separate skill from knowing language.

In many cases, the scientists used Genie's language development to help them gauge her overall psychological state. For instance, she consistently confused the pronouns you and me, often saying, "Mama love you" while pointing to herself, which Curtiss attributed to a manifestation of her inability to distinguish who she was from who someone else was. The scientists especially noted that she often understood conceptual information even if she lacked the grammar to express it, which they wrote demonstrated that she had greater cognitive abilities than most children in congruous phases of language acquisition. In some instances, learning a new aspect of language played a direct role in furthering her development. At the time she learned to say, "May I have [example]" as a ritual phrase she was also learning how to use money, and Curtiss wrote that this phrase gave her the ability to ask for payment and fueled her desire to make money, causing her to take a more active role in performing activities which would lead to a monetary reward.

At the start of testing Genie's voice was still extremely high-pitched and soft, which linguists believed accounted for some of her abnormal expressive language, and the scientists worked hard to improve it. Her voice gradually became moderately lower and louder, although it remained unusually high and soft, and she began to better articulate words. Despite this she consistently deleted or substituted sounds, making her extremely difficult to understand. The scientists believed she was often unaware of her pronunciation, but on other occasions she produced haplologies which were clearly intentional and would only speak more clearly if firmly, explicitly requested to; Curtiss attributed the latter to her trying to say as little as possible and still be understood. Eventually Curtiss and Marilyn convinced her to stop attempting her most extreme haplologies, but she continued to delete sounds when possible, causing linguists following the case to refer to her as "the Great Abbreviator".

Papers contemporaneous with the case study indicated that Genie was learning new vocabulary and grammar throughout her entire stay with the Riglers, and were optimistic about her potential to varying degrees. Nonetheless, even by mid-1975, there were still many aspects of language that she had not acquired. Furthermore, although she could understand and produce longer utterances, she still primarily spoke in short phrases such as "Ball belong hospital". Despite the clear increase in her conversational competence, the scientists wrote that it remained very low compared to normal people. Curtiss and Fromkin ultimately concluded that because Genie had not learned a first language before the critical period had ended, she was unable to fully acquire a language.

==== Recalling past events ====
In late 1971 Genie spoke about an encounter that had occurred weeks prior, marking the first time she used language to describe a past event. Sometime during early to mid-1972, the Riglers overheard Genie saying, "Father hit big stick. Father is angry," to herself, demonstrating that she could talk about her life from before she had started to learn language. During the rest of her stay with the Riglers she would constantly repeat, "Father hit," to herself, and before they worked with her to understand the concept of death she often asked them where her father was, afraid that he would come to get her. The scientists encouraged her to tell them as much as possible about her childhood, and although she did not often speak about it, she gave researchers valuable new information when she did. As she learned more language, she gradually began to speak about her father and his treatment of her in greater detail.

Father hit arm. Big wood. Genie cry ... Not spit. Father. Hit face—spit. Father hit big stick. Father is angry. Father hit Genie big stick. Father take piece wood hit. Cry. Father make me cry. Father is dead.

==== Nonverbal communication ====
In contrast to her linguistic abilities, Genie's nonverbal communication continued to excel. She invented her own system of gestures and pantomimed certain words as she said them, and also acted out events which she could not express in language. Initially she would only draw pictures if someone asked her to, but during her stay with the Riglers she began to use drawings to communicate if she could not explain something in words. In addition to her own drawings she often used pictures from magazines to relate to daily experiences, and for reasons the scientists never determined she especially collected pictures of things that frightened her. Sometime during mid-1972, Marilyn observed that a magazine picture of a wolf sent her into a terror, after which the Riglers asked her mother if she knew a possible cause for this reaction; she then informed them that her husband had acted like a dog to intimidate Genie, making the underlying reason for her fear apparent to the scientists for the first time.

Throughout Genie's stay the scientists saw how frequently and effectively she used her nonverbal skills, and never determined what she did to elicit such strong reactions from other people. David vividly remembered an occasion when he and Genie passed a father and a young boy carrying a toy fire truck without speaking to each other and said he suddenly turned around and gave it to Genie. Curtiss also recalled one time when, while she and Genie were walking and had stopped at a busy intersection, she unexpectedly heard a purse emptying; she turned to see a woman stop at the intersection and exit her car to give Genie a plastic purse, even though she had not said anything. To take full advantage of her nonverbal communication abilities, in 1974 the Riglers arranged for her to learn a form of sign language.

=== Continued brain exams ===
==== Language tests ====
Starting in fall 1971, under the direction of Curtiss, Victoria Fromkin, and Stephen Krashen—who was then also one of Fromkin's graduate students—linguists administered regular dichotic listening tests to Genie until 1973. Their results consistently corroborated the initial findings of Ursula Bellugi and Edward Klima. Researchers therefore concluded that Genie was acquiring language in the right hemisphere of her brain, and definitively ruled out the possibility that her language lateralization was only reversed. Since she had no noted physiological problems with her left hemisphere, they believed abnormal neurological activity in her left hemisphere—which they speculated came from her atrophied language center—blocked all language reception in her right ear but did not obstruct non-language sounds.

Linguists also administered several brain exams specifically intended to measure Genie's language comprehension. On one such test, she had no difficulty giving the correct meaning of sentences containing familiar homophones, demonstrating that her receptive comprehension was significantly better than her expressive language. She also did very well at identifying rhymes, both tasks that adult split-brain and left hemispherectomy patients had previously been recorded performing well on. During these tests an EEG consistently picked up more activity from the two electrodes over the right hemisphere of her brain than from those over the normal locations of the Broca's area and Wernicke's area in the left hemisphere of a right-handed person, and found especially high involvement from her right anterior cerebral cortex, further supporting the researchers' conclusion that she was using her right hemisphere to acquire language.

==== Additional tests ====
Curtiss, Fromkin, and Krashen continued to measure Genie's mental age through a variety of measures, and she consistently showed an extremely high degree of scatter. She measured significantly higher on tests which did not require language, such as the Leiter Scale, than on tests with any kind of language component, such as the verbal section of the Wechsler Intelligence Scale for Children and the Peabody Picture Vocabulary Test. In addition, throughout Genie's stay with the Riglers, they tested a variety of her brain functions and her performance on different tasks. For these they primarily used tachistoscopic tests, and during 1974 and 1975 they also gave her a series of evoked response tests.

As early as 1972, Genie scored between the level of an 8-year-old and an adult on all right-hemisphere tasks the scientists tested her on, and showed extraordinarily rapid improvement on them. Her ability to piece together objects solely from tactile information was exceptionally good, and on spatial awareness tests her scores were reportedly the highest ever recorded. Similarly, on a Mooney Face Test in May 1975 she had the highest score in medical literature at that time, and on a separate gestalt perception test her extrapolated score was in the 95th percentile for adults. (Note: As all of Genie's incorrect answers on the Mooney Face Test were pictures of either masks or caricatures of faces, Curtiss thought Genie may not have understood that she was only supposed to select the realistic looking faces and therefore may have been able to score even higher.) On several other tests involving right-hemisphere tasks, her results were markedly better than other people in equivalent phases of mental development; in 1977 the scientists measured her capacity for stereognosis at approximately the level of a typical 10-year-old, significantly higher than her estimated mental age. The scientists also noted in 1974 that she seemed to be able to recognize the location she was in and was good at getting from one place to another, an ability which primarily involves the right hemisphere.

Genie's performance on these tests led the scientists to believe that her brain had lateralized and that her right hemisphere had undergone specialization. Because her performance was so high on such a wide variety of tasks predominantly utilizing the right hemisphere of her brain, they concluded her exceptional abilities extended to typical right-hemisphere functions in general and were not specific to any individual task. They attributed her extreme right hemisphere dominance to the fact that what very little cognitive stimulation she had received was almost entirely visual and tactile. While even this had been extremely minimal it had been enough to commence lateralization in her right hemisphere, and the severe imbalance in stimulation caused her right hemisphere to become extraordinarily developed.

By contrast, Genie performed significantly below average and showed much slower progress on all tests measuring predominantly left-hemisphere tasks. Krashen wrote that by 2 years after the first examinations on her mental age her scores on left-hemisphere tasks consistently fell into the 2 1/2- to 3-year-old range, only showing an improvement of 1 1/2 years. On sequential order tests she consistently scored well below average for someone with a fully intact brain, although she did somewhat better on visual than on auditory tests. The scientists especially noted that she did not start to count until late 1972, and then only in an extremely deliberate and laborious manner. In January 1972 the scientists measured her in the 50th percentile for an 8 1/2- to 9-year-old on Raven's Progressive Matrices, although they noted she was outside of the age range of the test's design. (Note: Since she did very well on some individual parts of the test, and because previous results had shown indications of utilizing both hemispheres, Curtiss believed Genie could have used her gestalt perception for some elements and was forced to use her analytic skills on others.) Similarly, when the scientists administered Knox Cubes tests in 1973 and 1975 her score improved from the level of a 6-year-old to a 7 1/2-year-old, more rapid than her progress with language but significantly slower than that of right hemisphere tasks.

There were a few primarily right hemisphere tasks Genie did not perform well on. On one memory for design test, she scored at a "borderline" level in October 1975, although she did not make the mistakes typical of patients with brain damage. In addition, on a Benton Visual Retention Test and an associated facial recognition test her scores were far lower than any average scores for people without brain damage. Although these contrasted with observations of her in everyday situations, researchers wrote that they anticipated these results. Curtiss's explanation was that these tasks likely require use of both hemispheres, noting that previous results on the memory for design test found a negative impact from abnormal brain function in either hemisphere and that these would, therefore, be very difficult for Genie since her brain activity was so right-hemisphere dominant.

== Loss of funding and research interest ==
On several occasions during the course of the case study, the NIMH voiced misgivings about the lack of usable scientific data researchers generated from the case study and the disorganized state of project records. Outside of the linguistics aspect, David Rigler did not clearly define any parameters for the scope of the study, and both the extremely high volume and incoherence of the research team's data left the scientists unable to determine the importance of much of the information they collected. After the initial grant and a one-year extension Rigler proposed an additional three-year extension, and the NIMH's grants committee acknowledged that the study had clearly benefited Genie but concluded that the research team had not adequately addressed their concerns. In a unanimous decision, the committee denied the extension request.

== Early adulthood ==
In 1975, when Genie turned 18, her mother stated that she wanted to care for her, and in mid-1975, the Riglers decided to end their foster parenting, and agreed to let her move back in with her mother at her childhood home. John Miner remained her legal guardian and the Riglers offered to continue assisting with her care, and despite the NIMH grant ending Curtiss continued regular testing and observations. While living together Genie's mother found many of her behaviors, especially her lack of self-control, very distressing, and within a few months the task of caring for her by herself overwhelmed her. She then contacted the California Department of Health to find care for her, which David Rigler said she did without his or Marilyn's knowledge, and in the latter part of 1975 authorities transferred her to the first of what would become a succession of foster homes.

The environment in Genie's new placement was extremely rigid and gave her far less access to her favorite objects and activities, and her caretakers rarely allowed her mother to visit. Soon after she moved in they began to subject her to extreme physical and emotional abuse, resulting in both incontinence and constipation resurfacing and causing her to revert to her coping mechanism of silence. The incident with the strongest impact occurred when they severely beat her for vomiting and told her that if she did it again, they would never let her see her mother, making her terrified of opening her mouth for fear of vomiting and facing more beatings. This made her frightened of eating or speaking, and she became extremely withdrawn and almost exclusively relied on sign language for communication. During this time Curtiss was the only person who had worked with her to have regular contact with her, continuing to conduct weekly meetings to continue her testing, and she noted the extreme deterioration in her condition. She quickly started petitioning to have her taken out of the home, but Curtiss said that both she and social services had a difficult time contacting Miner, only succeeding after several months. After Miner witnessed the extent of Genie's regression firsthand, in late April 1977 he and David Rigler intervened to remove her from this location.

Because of Genie's previous treatment, Miner and the Riglers arranged for her to stay at the hospital for two weeks, where her condition moderately improved. Authorities then placed her in another foster home, where she did fairly well, but in mid-December 1977, the arrangement suddenly ended. Through the end of that month and into early January, she lived in a temporary setting, after which authorities put her in another foster home. During this time, Curtiss wrote to Miner that Genie did not understand the reasons she was moving and believed it was her fault for not being a good enough person, and said the frequency with which her living arrangements changed further traumatized her and caused continued developmental regression.

=== Lawsuit ===
In 1976, Curtiss finished and presented her dissertation, entitled Genie: A Psycholinguistic Study of a Modern-Day "Wild Child", and the following year Academic Press published it. Prior to its publication Genie's mother had reportedly thought of her and Curtiss as friends, but in early 1978 she wrote that she was very offended at the title and some of the contents of Curtiss's dissertation. She decided to sue the hospital, her therapists, their supervisors, and several of the researchers, including Curtiss, Rigler, Kent, and Hansen. Privately she disputed some of the details in Curtiss's dissertation of her husband's treatment of the family during Genie's childhood, but her official complaint did not; instead she asserted violations of patient confidentiality, and accused the research team of prioritizing testing over Genie's welfare, invading her privacy, and severely overworking her.

Regional media immediately picked up the lawsuit, and members of the research team were shocked when they found out about it. All of the scientists named in the suit were adamant that they never coerced Genie, maintaining that her mother and lawyers grossly exaggerated the length and nature of their testing, and denied any breaches of confidentiality. While David was giving his deposition he discovered that Ruch had goaded Genie's mother into suing, and in an interview several years later the lawyers who worked with her confirmed Ruch heavily influenced the actions of Genie's mother throughout the course of the lawsuit. According to author Russ Rymer, the suit was settled in 1984. However, in 1993 David wrote, "... the case never came to trial. It was dismissed by the Superior Court of the State of California 'with prejudice,' meaning that because it was without substance it can never again be refiled."

== 1978–present ==
Curtiss said that in late December 1977, she had been asked if she could be Genie's legal guardian, but, after she met with her on January 3, 1978, her mother suddenly stopped allowing her and the rest of the research team to see her, which immediately ended all testing and observations. State authorities had an increasingly contentious relationship with Miner since at least 1975, and in early 1978 they discovered that after Genie turned 18 he had failed to update his status from being her legal guardian as a minor to that of being her legal guardian as an adult incapable of caring for herself. Without consulting him, on March 30 of that year state authorities officially transferred guardianship to her mother, who subsequently forbade all of the scientists except Shurley from seeing her or Genie. Ruch remained in contact with Genie's mother and continued to spread negative rumors about Genie's condition, especially targeting Curtiss, until 1986, when a stroke left her with aphasia. She died two years later, following another stroke. (Note: In his book on Genie Russ Rymer stated that Ruch died in 1989, while the Nova documentary based on Rymer's book states she died in 1988.)

From January 1978 until the early 1990s, Genie moved through a series of at least four additional foster homes and institutions, some of which subjected her to extreme physical abuse and harassment. Shurley saw her at her 27th birthday party in 1984 and again in 1986, and in an interview years later he said that both times she was very depressed and almost entirely uncommunicative. In 1992, Curtiss told Russ Rymer that the only two updates she had heard on Genie indicated she barely spoke and was depressed and withdrawn. When Rymer published a two-part magazine article on Genie in The New Yorker in April of that year he wrote that she lived in an institution and only saw her mother one weekend every month, with the first edition of his 1993 book, entitled Genie: A Scientific Tragedy, stating this as well. (Note: Also published as Genie: An Abused Child's Flight From Silence and Genie: Escape From A Silent Childhood.) The afterword of the 1994 edition of the book, written in November 1993, detailed conversations he had with Genie's mother—who had since gone blind again, from glaucoma—just before and after the publication of his magazine articles. At that time she told him that Genie had recently moved into a more supportive foster home which permitted regular visits, and said that she was happy and, although hard to understand, was significantly more verbal.

Several people who worked with Genie, including Curtiss and Kent, harshly criticized Rymer's works. A late April 1993 New York Times review of the book from scientific reporter Natalie Angier, which took an extremely negative view of the research team, prompted David Rigler to write to the Times. In his letter, published in the Times in mid-June 1993, he responded to what he said were major factual errors in Angier's review and gave his first public account of his involvement in Genie's case. He wrote that, as of his writing, she was doing well living in a small, private facility where her mother regularly visited her. His letter also stated that he and Marilyn were in contact with her mother and had recently reestablished contact with Genie, who he said had immediately recognized and greeted him and Marilyn by name, and that, "My wife and I have resumed our (now infrequent) visits with Genie and her mother."

As of 2016, Genie was a ward of the state of California living in an undisclosed location in Los Angeles. In two articles published in May 2008, ABC News reported that someone who spoke to them under condition of anonymity had hired a private investigator who located her in 2000. According to the investigator, she was living a simple lifestyle in a small private facility for mentally underdeveloped adults and appeared to be happy, and reportedly only spoke a few words but could still communicate fairly well in sign language. Genie's mother died of natural causes at the age of 87 in 2003. The news stories also included the only public interview with her brother, who was then living in Ohio; he said that since leaving the Los Angeles area, he had visited her and their mother only once, in 1982, and had refused to watch or read anything about her life until just prior to the interview, but had heard she was doing well. A story by journalist Rory Carroll in The Guardian, published in July 2016, reported that she still lived in state care and that her brother died in 2011, and said that despite repeated efforts Curtiss had been unable to renew contact with her.

== Impact ==
Genie is one of the best-known case studies of delayed language acquisition in a child outside of studies on deaf children. Susan Curtiss argued that, even if humans possess the innate ability to acquire language, Genie demonstrated the necessity of early language stimulation in the left hemisphere of the brain to start. Since she never fully acquired grammar, Curtiss submitted that she provided evidence for a weaker variation of the critical period hypothesis. Her nonverbal skills were exceptionally good, which demonstrated that even nonverbal communication was fundamentally different from language. Because her language acquisition occurred in the right hemisphere of her brain, its course also aided linguists in refining existing hypotheses on the capacity for right-hemisphere language acquisition in people after the critical period.

Since the publication of Curtiss's findings, her arguments have become widely accepted in the field of linguistics. Many linguistics books have used Genie's case study as an example to illustrate principles of language acquisition, frequently citing it as support of Chomsky's hypothesis of language being innate to humans and of a modified version of Lenneberg's critical period hypothesis, and her work with Genie provided the impetus for several additional case studies. In addition, the disparity between Curtiss's pre- and post-1977 analyses of Genie's language has sparked debate among other linguists regarding how much grammar she acquired and whether she could have acquired more. No one directly involved in her case has responded to this controversy.

The study of Genie's brain aided scientists in refining several existing hypotheses regarding brain lateralization, especially its effect on language development. In particular, the disparity between Genie's linguistic abilities and her competence in other aspects of human development strongly suggested there was a separation of cognition and language acquisition, a new concept at the time. The unevenness of her ability to learn right-hemisphere versus left-hemisphere tasks gave the scientists valuable information about the manner in which certain brain functions develop, as well as the way lateralization affects a person's ability to improve upon them. Genie's difficulty with certain tasks which had been described as predominantly controlled in the right hemisphere also gave neuroscientists more insight into the processes controlling these functions.

=== Comparisons to other cases ===
In interviews and in several of their publications, the scientists acknowledged the influence that Jean Marc Gaspard Itard's work with Victor of Aveyron had on their research and testing. Genie's development has also influenced perceptions of him and the case study on him. Both researchers working with Genie and outside writers noted the influence of historical reports of language deprivation experiments, including accounts of the language deprivation experiments of Psamtik I, King James IV of Scotland, and Holy Roman Emperor Frederick II. The two ABC News stories on Genie compared her case to the Fritzl case, which had then recently come to public attention, especially pointing out similarities between the actions of her father and Josef Fritzl and noting the respective mental states of her and the three grandchildren Fritzl had kept captive upon entering into society. The research team and outside scientists also contrasted her with a case in the 1950s of a girl, known by the name Isabella, whose first exposure to anyone besides her deaf non-speaking mother came at the age of 6 but who successfully acquired language and developed fully normal social skills within a year.

=== Ethical dispute ===
During the grant meetings in May 1971, some of the scientists, including Jay Shurley and David Elkind, voiced concern that the prevailing methods of research pursued scientific study at the expense of Genie's well-being and could cause love and attention to be contingent on her language acquisition. Shurley said that there was strong disagreement during the initial grant meetings and the atmosphere grew increasingly tense and bitter, especially noting that the later meetings excluded all non-scientists and thereby shunned valuable input from some of the hospital staff who had worked most closely with Genie. After May 1971, Elkind declined to participate in the study further, despite having personally known both the Riglers for several years, and in an interview years later he cited a desire not to be involved in a case which, in his view, prioritized scientific research over Genie's care. While Shurley acknowledged that the scientists at the center of her case were in a completely unprecedented situation, he also decided to minimize his involvement over these concerns and later said that by the conclusion of the study all of the scientists, including himself, had been guilty to varying degrees of using Genie as an object and putting themselves and their goals ahead of her and her mother's best interests.

Kent, Hansen, the Riglers, and Curtiss readily acknowledged that it had been extremely difficult to determine the course of the study, but maintained that all disputes during the meetings were impersonal and typical of scientific discourse. After the case study ended David said that Shurley's early recommendations were the only useful advice he received on handling Genie and that, despite their later disagreements, he had attempted to follow them as much as possible. The Riglers and Curtiss further stated that everyone involved in Genie's life, with the exception of Ruch, worked together as best they could to rehabilitate her and never fought with each other, and independently denied allegations of factionalism. Ruch never stated a motive for her actions, but members of the research team believed they were due to her anger over her foster custody rejection and her perception that the hospital staff influenced the decision. The role of the scientists in her case has become the source of debate within the scientific community.

Several people have also emphasized the lack of distinction between Genie's caretakers and her therapists. Shurley thought that Ruch would have been the best guardian for her, and felt the Riglers gave her adequate care but viewed her as a test subject first. Rymer contended that the roles of everyone involved in her life became progressively less clear, citing the starting point as the appointment of Miner as legal counsel for her mother, and that personal friendships prevented them from recognizing it. He argued that this interfered with providing her the best possible care and compromised their objectivity, in turn contributing to the case study's lack of coherence, and both he and Harlan Lane emphasized that making David a foster parent accelerated this breakdown. Several independent reviews of Genie's case also accused the Riglers and the other scientists of abandoning her after the case study concluded.

On several occasions, the Riglers maintained that their home had been the best available option for Genie at the time, and said that both they and everyone who worked with her thought she was doing well while she was living with them. They also said they genuinely loved her and always provided her the best care possible, pointing out that she had made substantial progress in every aspect of her development while living with them, and they and Curtiss both said her mother had prevented them from continuing to work with her as they had wanted. While representing the Riglers in court in 1977 and 1978 Miner went out of his way to give them credit for acting as foster parents to her for four years, and when Curtiss spoke to Rymer in the early 1990s she praised their work with Genie and their willingness to take her into their home, although she also said she felt they had not done enough when she told them about Genie's abuse in foster care. Leiber argued that the scientists' inability to do more for her was largely out of their control, and primarily the result of legal and institutional processes surrounding her placement.

== Media ==
Several books about feral or abused children contain chapters on Genie, and many on linguistics and psychology also discuss her case at length. In 1994, Nova released a documentary about her based on Rymer's book, titled Secret of the Wild Child, which won multiple Emmy Awards. (Note: Broadcast as Genie: A Deprived Child in the United Kingdom.) The scientists' footage in Nova showed from the case study archives had significantly deteriorated, and required restoration for use in the documentary. In 2002, an episode of the television series Body Shock on feral children entitled "Wild Child" included a segment on Genie. (Note: Broadcast as Wild Child: The Story of Feral Children in the United States.) In addition to Rymer's magazine articles and book, he said that he drew on her life and his experience researching her case for the theme of his 2013 novel Paris Twilight.

The independent film Mockingbird Don't Sing, released in 2001, is about Genie's case, primarily from Curtiss's perspective. For legal reasons, all of the names in the film were changed.

== See also ==
- A Man Without Words – 1991 book by Susan Schaller
- Anna – American feral child
- Blanche Monnier – French woman kept locked away for 25 years (1849–1913)
- Kaspar Hauser – German youth of mysterious background (1812–1833)
- Marcos Rodríguez Pantoja – Spanish feral child (1946–2026)
- Marie-Angélique Memmie Le Blanc – Feral child (c. 1712 – 1775)
- Oxana Malaya – Ukrainian feral child

== Sources and further reading ==
- Bickerton, Derek (1990), Language and Species, Chicago, IL: University of Chicago Press, ISBN 978-0-226-04610-5, OCLC 802686883.
- Brown, Lisa J.; Jones, Peter E. (2014), Bringing Back the Child: Language Development after Extreme Deprivation, Newcastle upon Tyne, U. K.: Cambridge Scholars Publishing, ISBN 978-1-4438-5972-1, OCLC 893890618.
- Curtiss, Susan (1977), Genie: A Psycholinguistic Study of a Modern-Day "Wild Child", Perspectives in Neurolinguistics and Psycholinguistics, Boston, MA: Academic Press, ISBN 978-0-12-196350-7, OCLC 3073433.
- Curtiss, Susan; Fromkin, Victoria A.; Rigler, David; Rigler, Marilyn; Krashen, Stephen D. (1975), "An update on the linguistic development of Genie" (PDF), in Dato, Daniel P. (ed.), Developmental Psycholinguistics: Theory and Applications, Georgetown University Round Table on Languages and Linguistics, Washington, D. C.: Georgetown University Press, pp. 145–153, ISBN 978-0-87840-110-9, OCLC 2114555.
- Newton, Michael (2002), Savage Girls and Wild Boys, New York, NY: Macmillan, ISBN 978-0-312-42335-3, OCLC 54696995.
- Pinker, Steven (2007), The Language Instinct: How The Mind Creates Language (3 ed.), New York, NY: HarperCollins, ISBN 978-0-06-095833-6, OCLC 263595357.
- Reynolds, Cecil R.; Fletcher-Janzen, Elaine, eds. (2004), Concise Encyclopedia of Special Education: A Reference for the Education of the Handicapped and Other Exceptional Children and Adults (2 ed.), Hoboken, NJ: John Wiley & Sons, pp. 428–429, ISBN 978-0-471-65251-9, OCLC 46975017.
- Rymer, Russ (1994), Genie: A Scientific Tragedy (2 ed.), New York, NY: Harper Perennial, ISBN 978-0-06-016910-7, OCLC 29616957.
- Sampson, Geoffrey (2005), The 'Language Instinct' Debate: Revised Edition, London, UK: Continuum Publishing, ISBN 978-1-4411-0764-0, OCLC 745866730.
