= A Man Without Words =

1991 book by Susan Schaller

- Author: Susan Schaller
- Language: English
- Published: 1991
- Publication place: United States

A Man Without Words is a book by Susan Schaller, first published in 1991, with a foreword by author and neurologist Oliver Sacks. The book is a case study of a 27-year-old deaf man whom Schaller teaches to sign for the first time, challenging the Critical Period Hypothesis that humans cannot learn language after a certain age.

The book features in 1,011 WorldCat libraries, and has been translated into Dutch, Japanese and German. The book was reviewed by The Los Angeles Times, The New York Times, The Boston Globe, and The Washington Post A second edition, with new material, was published in August 2012 by University of California Press.

== Author ==
Susan Schaller is a writer, public speaker and human rights advocate located in Berkeley, California. She was born in Cheyenne, Wyoming, graduated from San Jose State University in San Jose, California, and earned her master's degree in public health education from the University of North Carolina.

== Summary ==
Susan Schaller began studying American Sign Language (ASL) at university in one of the first programs to present ASL classes to hearing students. Schaller recalls that she chose to sit in on this class randomly, and by doing so changed her life. Five years later, in 1970, Schaller moved to Los Angeles with her husband and became an interpreter for the deaf at a local community college. She was then hired by the 'Reading Skills Class,' a class of deaf adults learning to read English, and it was here that she met Ildefonso. Within a few minutes of introductions, it became clear to her that Ildefonso did not understand her signs as a form of communication, but he diligently copied Schaller's movements hoping to derive some meaning. Ildefonso seemed to see Schaller's signs as commands more than representations of abstract concepts, and for several days appeared to make no progress. It was not until Schaller began signing the word "cat" to an imaginary student that Ildefonso suddenly understood her attempt to communicate meaning, at which point he began to cry.

Schaller worried that Ildefonso would not return to class the next day, but he did. After further sessions Ildefonso began carrying a list of English words in his pocket that, Schaller noted, he treated with the utmost care. After Ildefonso's breakthrough, Schaller found his learning progress very slow, and she worried that he would be unable to acquire language. She then approached linguist Ursula Bellugi at the Laboratory for Cognitive Neuroscience, where Bellugi specialized in the biological foundation of language, and language acquisition, with specific reference to ASL. Bellugi told Schaller that she had strong reservations whether Ildefonso could learn language at his present age (because according to the Critical Period Hypothesis language is only properly mastered in youth). Bellugi also noted that none of her students in tests of language acquisition had yet reached puberty, and that she could find no documented cases of an adult learning a first language. Schaller chose to move forward with teaching Ildefonso, as his dedication inspired her. Schaller also noted that Ildefonso was often in charge of determining the direction of the lesson. Schaller found that Ildefonso had no particular difficulty learning simple arithmetic using the numbers one through nine, and later ten and beyond, but the concepts of proper names and time proved more difficult. Schaller also noted that when he was learning colors, green triggered especially strong feelings for Ildefonso.

As time progressed, Ildefonso's progress was still slow, but he was able to communicate with Schaller. In later months stories began to emerge from Ildefonso's past, including a run-in with the border patrol, which explained Ildefonso's anxious response to the color green. In fact, Ildefonso's reaction was so strong that Schaller went to the local border patrol office to question them on their procedures in handling adults without language. At the end of four months, Ildefonso told Schaller that he would have to quit school in order to work.

Throughout her narrative of the four-month period of working with Ildefonso, Schaller touches on many subjects including race, religion, colonization, and Deaf Culture.

== Comparative cases ==
Schaller compares and contrasts Ildefonso's case with those of other individuals with impaired language or linguistic isolation. They include Peter the Wild Boy, Kaspar Hauser, Victor of Aveyron, and Ishi. Particular attention is given to "Genie," a feral child who was the victim of extraordinarily severe abuse, neglect and social isolation.

== Criticism ==
The first edition of the book was reviewed by author Lou Ann Walker in The New York Times shortly after publication. She complained "It is frustrating not to learn more about Ildefonso and his life in this slim volume," but acknowledged that "[v]irtually nothing has been written about adults without language, but Ms. Schaller makes it clear that their numbers are greater than we think."

The book has been criticized for Schaller's comparisons between Ildefonso and children like Victor or Genie. Carol Padden writes that Schaller does not do enough to highlight the basic differences between these cases: since Ildefonso was raised by a caretaker and in better conditions than Genie or Victor, and Ildefonso apparently functions socially (in a limited way) that was beyond the capability of these earlier case studies. However, Schaller did at least acknowledge this issue, saying that languagelessness is the only similarity between Ildefonso and the "wild children," and writing, "Deafness is not wildness, and the isolation of languagelessness alone is not the isolation of the woods or a basement or imprisonment on a chair" (Schaller p. 156).

It has also been suggested that the characterization of Ildefonso as entirely "languageless" may be an oversimplification. In the same review, Padden speculates that "Schaller may have been teaching language to Ildefonso, but more accurately, she was teaching him how to map a new set of symbols on a most likely already existent framework of symbolic competence."

The book has also been criticized for its lack of scientific rigor, especially that Schaller did not perform experiments on Ildefonso to collect data about his cognitive and communicative skills prior to teaching him language. The most strongly-worded critique along these lines might be by linguist Jürgen Tesak, who wrote the following in a review of the book for the journal Language:

"The process of Ildefonso's language acquisition and his linguistic skills are described unsystematically and anecdotally, if at all. Instead of data, [Schaller] presents many emotional intuitions and wild guesses about Ildefonso's 'languageless' mental world. Thus the claims made by the author in relation to language (acquisition) in Ildefonso do not have a sound empirical basis. [...] given the poor documentation of Ildefonso's language skills and the contradictory information on his linguistic, social, and communicative background, there is no other choice than to treat [Schaller's] book with a maximum of caution."

Schaller makes no claims as to the scientific rigor of her results, however, and she states on the first page of her introduction, "I am neither deaf nor a linguist" (Schaller p. 17). Not all academics share Tesak's reservations; for example, Schaller's book has been cited by many cognitive scientists without any apparent skepticism.

Others have countered that Schaller and the topic of languageless adults have been excluded from the field of linguistics. Temple Grandin, a prominent animal behavior scientist, writes:

"The best book on a normal language-less person is A Man Without Words by Susan Schaller. Susan Schaller has spent twenty years travelling and researching language-less people completely on her own. The experts she tried to get help from when she first started out were dismissive, uncooperative, or hostile."

One reviewer noted that the author said that when Ildefonso meets a deaf person, they exchange more information in a brief conversation with him than she had been able to exchange in weeks. The reviewer concluded that Ildefonso may not have been as "languageless" as Schaller believed.

== Adaptations ==
A short documentary film about Ildefonso and Schaller, with the same title as the book, was produced in 2013 by filmmaker Zack Godshall, whose previous work includes the 2011 Sundance film Lord Byron. This film was shown at the Southern Screen film festival in Lafayette, Louisiana.

An adaptation of the book for the stage was written by Derek Davidson and premiered by An Appalachian Summer Festival in Boone, NC, in July 2015.

== See also ==
- Deaf Culture
- Genie (feral child)
- Helen Keller
- Language Acquisition
- Language
- Linguistics
  - Cognitive Linguistics
