= John Miner =

John Miner or Minor may refer to:

- John Miner (musician), American musician
- John Miner (ice hockey) (born 1965), Canadian hockey player
- John Miner (attorney) (1918–2011), Los Angeles prosecutor
- John B. Minor (1813–1895), teacher of law
- John O. Miner (1910–1999), U.S. Navy admiral
- Jack Miner (1865–1944), or "Wild Goose Jack", U.S. born Canadian conservationist
- John Minor v. Shurbal Tillotson on List of United States Supreme Court cases, volume 32

== See also ==
- Jack Minore (born 1938), American politician
- John Mynors, MP for Newcastle-under-Lyme
