= Russ Rymer =

American author and freelance journalist

Russ Rymer (born May 17, 1952) is an American author and freelance journalist. He has contributed articles to the New York Times, the Los Angeles Times, The New Yorker, National Geographic, Harper's, Smithsonian, Vogue, Los Angeles Magazine, and other publications.

== Career ==
His first book, Genie, a Scientific Tragedy (1993, also called Genie: An Abused Child’s Flight From Silence), was a finalist for the National Book Critics Circle Award for Nonfiction and won a Whiting Award. It was adapted into a Nova documentary TV episode. His second book, about the American Beach community in Florida, is called American Beach: a Saga of Race, Wealth, and Memory. His third book and first novel, Paris Twilight, was published in 2013.

In 2005, Rymer became the editor-in-chief for Mother Jones, holding the position for one year. From 2011 to 2013 Rymer was the Joan Leiman Jacobson Non-Fiction Writer in Residence at Smith College. He was the 2009–2010 Carl and Lily Pforzheimer Foundation Fellow at the Harvard Radcliffe Institute. He has taught science writing at the Massachusetts Institute of Technology, the UC Berkeley Graduate School of Journalism, the California Institute of Technology, and St. Mary's College of California.

Rymer was a Guggenheim Fellow in 2002. In 2012 he was awarded the Ed Cunningham Award for best magazine reporting from abroad by the Overseas Press Club for his National Geographic report on the disappearance of languages, alongside photographer Lynn Johnson.

== Personal life ==
He is married to writer Susan Faludi.

== See also ==
- Genie (feral child)
