= Language deprivation =

Lack of exposure to language in childhood

Language deprivation is associated with the lack of linguistic stimuli that are necessary for the language acquisition processes in an individual. Research has shown that early exposure to a first language will predict future language outcomes. Experiments involving language deprivation are very scarce due to the ethical controversy associated with it. Roger Shattuck, an American writer, called language deprivation research "The Forbidden Experiment" because it required the deprivation of a normal human. Similarly, experiments were performed by depriving animals of social stimuli to examine psychosis. Although there has been no formal experimentation on this topic, there are several cases of language deprivation. The combined research on these cases has furthered the research in the critical period hypothesis and sensitive period in language acquisition.

== Cases of language deprivation ==
=== Genie ===
The most well-documented case of a language-deprived child with functional hearing was that of Genie. Genie was discovered in 1970 in the family home, where she was recognized as highly abnormal. A social welfare agency took her into custody and admitted Genie into a hospital. Before discovery, Genie had lived strapped and harnessed into a chair. Genie, 13 years of age upon discovery, was malnourished, insensitive to tactile senses, and silent even upon being evoked; however she had proper social skills and she was able to maintain eye contact with caregivers, giving the impression that she understood instruction. After being discharged from the hospital she was put in foster care where she received "informal" training.

The first tests of language were taken three years after her discovery. She was given a variety of language test measures to test her sound skills, comprehension skills, and grammatical skills. She was able to discriminate between initial and final consonants. However, she lacked pitch and volume control, her speech was described as high pitched and breathy with sound distortions, consonant clusters, neutralizing vowels, dropping final consonants, and reducing consonants. She was able to comprehend instructions but was dependent on pantomime and gesture. Genie was capable of discriminating affirmation from negative, comparative adjectives, and colour words. After four years of language stimulation, her linguistic performance was similar to that of a normal two-year-old infant. She had poor performance in complex sentences, interchangeably used the pronouns "you" and "me", and lacked the question form of sentence structure. Further studies were conducted focusing on the physiological state of Genie. She was right-handed but neurological tests showed that she processed her language in the right hemisphere. Normally right-handed people process language in the left hemisphere. She excelled in right-hemisphere processed tasks, such as face perception, holistic recall of unrelated objects, and number perception. Genie's language skills were deemed poor, and this was linked to the notion that she began to learn language when she was 13½.

=== Kaspar Hauser ===
An alleged case of language deprivation was of Kaspar Hauser, who was said to have been kept in a dungeon in Germany until the age of 17 and claimed he'd only received contact from a hooded man not long before his release. Sources stated that he had a small amount of language; other sources state that upon discovery he spoke a garbled sentence. He was able to learn enough language to write an autobiography and to also become a legal clerk. However, five years after his discovery he died of a stab wound.

=== Anna ===
Anna was born March 6, 1932, and was an illegitimate child. She was put in isolation by her mother because of this. Anna was kept tied to a chair and was malnourished due to being fed milk only. Upon discovery on February 6, 1938, she was sent to a county home. Further examination of Anna determined that she was very poor physiologically but that her senses were intact. During her stay at the county, she gained some body weight and began to build muscle in her body. She lived at the county home for nine months until she was moved to a foster home. Upon leaving she was still very unsocial, because there was no predetermined caregiver in the county home, which consisted of over 300 inmates and one nurse; often she was taken care of by inmates. The caregiver at the foster home used the same method to talk to Anna by which a mother would talk to their infant. During her tenure at the foster home, she underwent some mental development and was similar to a one-year-old. After a year at the foster home she was sent to a school for defective children. Although she could not speak at the time, she had a comprehension of instructions.

=== Isabelle ===
Another case of a child deprived at a young age is that of Isabelle. Confined to a room with a deaf and mute mother, she spent 6½ years in silence without any language stimulation. Upon discovery she was sent to a hospital where she was monitored for her apathetic behaviour. Now in a ward with children, she began to imitate other children in the ward to request attention. She had also begun language training. Eighteen months into her training her repertoire of words was estimated to be 1500–2500 words; she was also able to produce complex sentence structures. Throughout her training she began to use correct inflectional morphology, pronouns, and prepositions.

== Feral children ==
Feral children are children discovered by society to be living in the wild with the assumption that they were raised by animals. It is stated that such children are deprived of human associations and are too strongly conditioned with animal behaviours, such that the human development is permanently inhibited and the animal inhibitions are never lost throughout life. There are several known cases of feral children relearning language, the most well-known of which is Victor. Victor was found at the age of 13 and was given to Dr. Itard, who "experimented" on the child. Victor was also known as the "wild boy of Aveyron". He was characterized to be insensitive to temperature, uncivilized and to run on all fours. Dr. Jean Marc Gaspard Itard conducted training over a period of 5 years, during which time Victor was able to recover some speech.

== Deaf children ==
Deaf children who do not have access to fluent language models could be at risk of permanent, irreversible effects to their brains. These effects include not only a detrimental impact on language acquisition, but other cognitive and mental health difficulties as well. Hearing parents of deaf infants typically work with audiologists and other medical professionals who offer medical interventions for their child's hearing loss, including hearing aids and cochlear implants. They may be advised to use sign language in addition to spoken language. While most deaf infants who receive cochlear implants and auditory therapy early in life will achieve spoken language skills on par with their hearing peers, this effect is not universal; without appropriate supports, or in children with complicating medical conditions, those with cochlear implants exposed only to spoken language can still show a lack of spoken language ability when compared to hearing peers.

The effects of language deprivation in deaf children, like hearing children, can include permanently affecting their ability to ever achieve proficiency in a language. Deaf children who do not learn language until later in life are more likely to process signed languages not as linguistic input, but as visual input, contrasting with children exposed from birth, who process signed language in the same region of the brain in which hearing people process spoken language. Additionally, studies show a notable decrease in sign language grammar skills of deaf adults who were not exposed to sign until after age 5 when compared to those exposed from birth, and an even greater decrease in those who were not exposed until after age 8, in some cases being so poor as to have near-coincidence levels of accuracy.

There is conflicting evidence as to whether sign language exposure interferes with the development of spoken language. While some analysis has suggested that early sign language exposure may not hinder later spoken language development, other clinical research on children who use cochlear implants has found that those without exposure to sign language were almost twice as likely to achieve age-appropriate spoken language compared with children who were exposed to visual communication for 3 or more years. In either case, however, exposure to fluent language models was effective in mitigating risk for language deprivation.

== Research ==
The "critical period of learning" hypothesis states that a person must be exposed to language within a certain time period to acquire language effectively. Defenders of the hypothesis suggest that the time period ranges from early childhood to the end of puberty. Evidence has shown that those who learn language during the critical period will acquire native-like abilities in morphology, phonology, and syntax. Late learners who miss the critical period can still acquire basic syntactic abilities and vocabulary, but they will not achieve native-like grammatical abilities.

It has been proposed that an additional period of learning, called the "sensitive period", follows the critical period. Evidence has demonstrated that during this period abilities relating to morphology, phonology, and syntax may still be developing. However, if disruption occurs during this period language acquisition may not be negatively affected, so long as the language has been learned at the earlier, "critical" phase.

== See also ==
- Language deprivation experiments
- Language deprivation in deaf and hard of hearing children
