= Case study (psychology) =

Case study in psychology refers to the use of a descriptive research approach to obtain an in-depth analysis of a person, group, or phenomenon. A variety of techniques may be employed including personal interviews, direct-observation, psychometric tests, and archival records. In psychology case studies are most often used in clinical research to describe rare events and conditions, which contradict well established principles in the field of psychology. Case studies are generally a single-case design, but can also be a multiple-case design, where replication instead of sampling is the criterion for inclusion. Like other research methodologies within psychology, the case study must produce valid and reliable results in order to be useful for the development of future research. Distinct advantages and disadvantages are associated with the case study in psychology. The case study is sometimes mistaken for the case method, but the two are not the same.

== Advantages ==
One major advantage of the case study in psychology is the potential for the development of novel hypotheses for later testing. Second, the case study can provide detailed descriptions of specific and rare cases

== Disadvantages ==
Case studies cannot be used to determine causation.

== Famous case studies in psychology ==
- Harlow - Phineas Gage
- Breuer & Freud (1895) - Anna O.
- Cleckley's (1941) case studies of psychopathy (The Mask of Sanity) and multiple personality disorder (The Three Faces of Eve) (1957)
- Freud and Little Hans
- Freud and the Rat Man
- John Money and the John/Joan case
- Genie (feral child)
- Piaget's studies
- Rosenthal's book on the murder of Kitty Genovese
- Washoe (sign language)
- Patient H.M.
- Lev Zasetsky (A.R. Luria)
- Solomon Shereshevsky (A.R. Luria)
- When Prophecy Fails published in 1956, this study was done on a group that believed aliens were going to save them soon as the world was about to end, and what would happen to them when the day of ending didn't happen.

== See also ==
- Case study
- Research method
