= Mooney Face Test =

Cognitive test

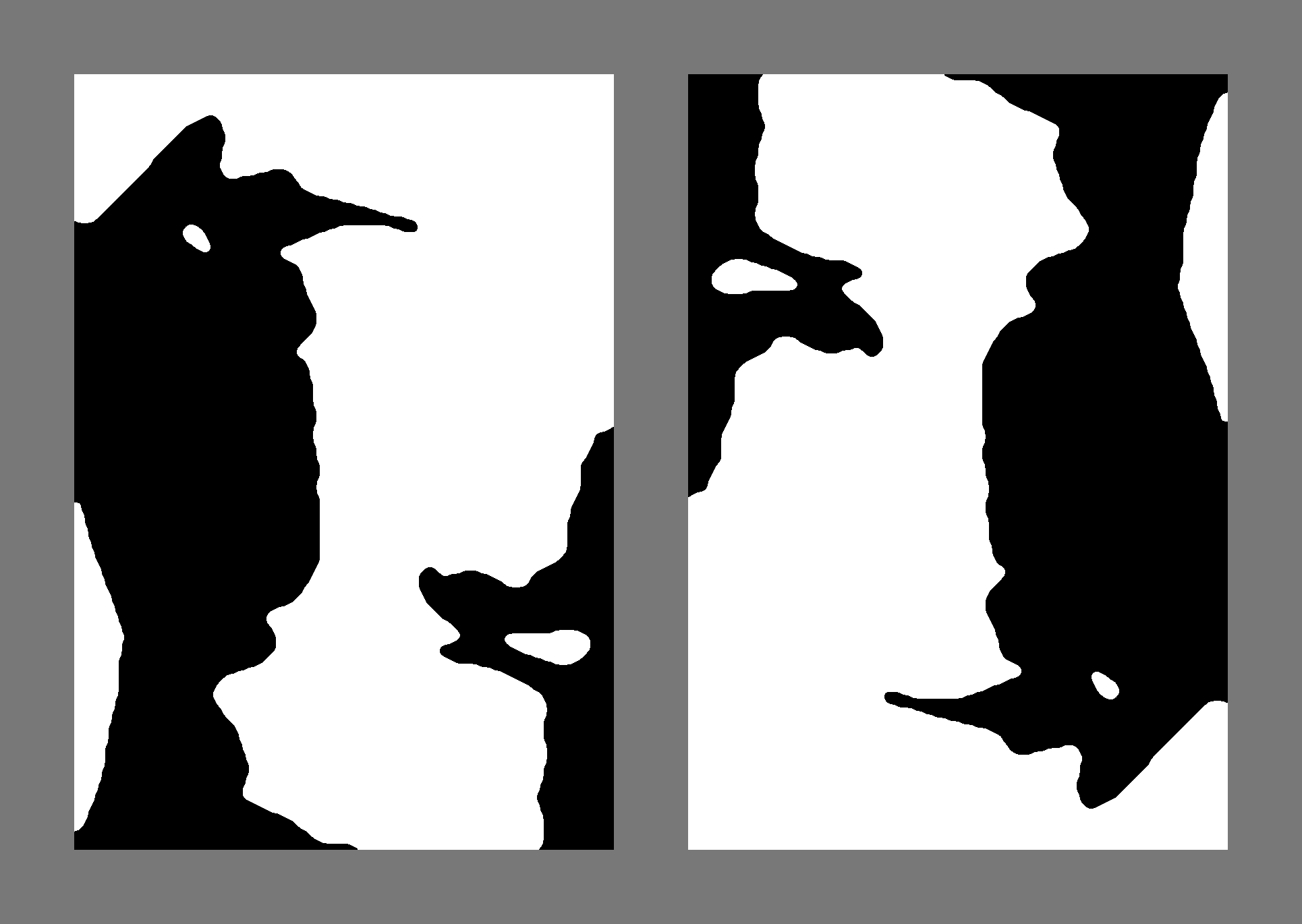
Example of a Mooney face, inverted (left) and right-side-up

The Mooney Face Test is a cognitive test developed by Craig M. Mooney in 1957. Participants in the test are shown series of black and white distorted photographs, presented in such a way that would require them to perform closure. The law of closure is one of the seven Gestalt principles that describes a tendency of our perception to view an incomplete object as continuing and complete. The test assumes that perception is based on the collected information taken from the different regions of the image, which then constitute a holistic representation of a face. Today, there are many iterations of the Mooney Face Test, a number of which contain images that involve image color inversion and facial feature scrambling.

Although the Mooney Face Test is widely used in the area of Gestalt facial recognition, it is recognized as the most reliable in Gestalt perception, more recent tests have shown flaws in the original test. As the original test consisted of 40 specific images and was designed to be administered by a rather short 40 minute personal interview, there was no ability to retest specific individuals or test the mass. To amend this, more recent studies have found a way to move Mooney Face Tests online, instating new requirements and materials that can not only test for reaction time, correlational ability, and personal ability, but are also repeatable and can reach a larger population.

== Original test ==
The test was first introduced in Mooney's 1957 article Age in the Development of Closure Ability in Children, in 1957.

In the test, participants are shown low-information, two-tone pictures of faces and are asked to identify features and distinguish between real and false faces. Participants are then asked to determine the identity of a set of images – categorizing what they see in each image as a boy, girl, man, woman, old man, or old woman. Many of the facial details are also obliterated to test Mooney's concept of "perceptual closure", or the ability to form coherent mental pictures with very little visual information.

There were two proposed issues on the original Mooney Face Test. The first was the inability of retesting. Due to the fact the test only consisted of 40 images, retesting would result in a bias. Additionally, there wasn't enough time given per participant to retest. The second issue was the all-or-nothing conflict due to their signal detection testing method. Participants could only report whether they saw a face or not, which was speculated to have resulted in high false alarm rates.

== Modern tests ==
The Mooney test has been updated by the Mooney-Verhallen test, which addressed the former's limited length, time-consuming interview stage, and high false alarm rates through the adoption of online testing and test-retest models. In this study, 397 participants ranging from ages 18 to 42 were tested. All participants were of European descent. In an effort to reduce false alarm rates, participants were also given a new task – rather than finding a holistic face within one image, participants would have to find specific facial features within an image shown among two distractions. In other words, this new test used a three alternative forced (3AFC) choice module rather than all-or-nothing. Other variations of their modernized Mooney Face test have also developed new images in which the face is inverted, upside down, or distorted further. Overall, participants all performed quite well, with about 7% of participants getting every question correct.

Participants in the Mooney-Verhallen test were also given the task to rate their own ability of facial discrimination on a scale from 1-10 (10 being most confident, 1 being least confident), allowing for post-testing comparison. Data showed that participants were typically able to accurately rate their own ability of facial discrimination. Among the 397 participants, 370 participants had their genome sequenced as well. In correlational discussion, researchers tentatively identified an association between performance on the Mooney Face Test and a polymorphism in the RAPGEF5 gene. Within this study, data also showed that male participants generally outperformed female participants in terms of reaction time and accuracy, however, it didn't show any correlation in ability with age.

Another study with 40 participants also found that males tended to outperform female participants.

In yet another test, individual participants were studied on a more intimate level as to see how external influences affected performance. These influences include individual's personality, predisposed cognitive abilities, and perceptual exposure. Previously thought to have little impact on overall performance, these external influences are now being tested in the updated versions of the Mooney Face Test. Results suggested that reliability is hard to assess within a small group study because of the pertinence of individual influence.

== Prior Knowledge and Recognition ==
Beyond its original use as a static face-recognition test, the Mooney stimulus set has been adapted into the Mooney Image Disambiguation Paradigm, an experimental design used in cognitive neuroscience to study how prior knowledge shapes perception. In this design, participants first view the two-tone Mooney images without knowing their content (pre-disambiguation), are then shown the corresponding clear grayscale photographs (disambiguation), and finally see the same ambiguous images again (post-disambiguation) — allowing researchers to measure the before/after effect of newly acquired knowledge on an otherwise identical physical stimulus. This extension broadened the test beyond faces to include animals, objects, and scenes, and beyond behavioral scoring to include neuroimaging measures such as fMRI, which typically show reduced activity in early visual cortex for disambiguated images (expectation suppression) alongside multivariate evidence that neural representations become more similar to those evoked by the original photographs (representational sharpening). These findings have made the Mooney paradigm an important empirical tool for predictive coding and Bayesian brain theories of perception, since any change in recognition or brain response must stem from acquired internal knowledge rather than from a change in the stimulus itself. This neuroscience-oriented use represents a significant expansion of Mooney's original 1957 closure test, repurposing it as a general paradigm for studying rapid, one-shot perceptual learning rather than only individual differences in face closure ability.
