= Language deprivation in children with hearing loss =

Language deprivation in deaf and hard-of-hearing children is a delay in language development that occurs when sufficient exposure to language, spoken or signed, is not provided in the first few years of a deaf or hard of hearing child's life, often called the critical or sensitive period. Early intervention, parental involvement, and other resources all work to prevent language deprivation. Children who experience limited access to language—spoken or signed—may not develop the necessary skills to successfully assimilate into the academic learning environment. There are various educational approaches for teaching deaf and hard of hearing individuals. Decisions about language instruction is dependent upon a number of factors including extent of hearing loss, availability of programs, and family dynamics.

== Access to language ==
=== Typical language development for deaf and hard of hearing children ===
Similar linguistic milestones are found in both signed and spoken languages. Reduced access to language may result in behavioral problems, as the child does not have a way to express his wants or needs. Language deprivation may also affect their neurological development. The timing and quality of language exposure are more important than hearing status for developing age-appropriate skills.

=== Technology and interventions ===
With currently available technology and interventions, children are likely to successfully achieve age-expected spoken language skills. Technology such as cochlear implants, hearing aids, and bone-anchored hearing aids can potentially help provide access to spoken language. This access can vary greatly from person to person due to factors such as cause and severity of deafness, the age of when hearing technology is introduced, and time of language exposure. Speech therapy, audiology, and other services have the potential to help maximize the access provided through hearing technology. Even for children using hearing technology, the age they were exposed to language (whether visual or spoken) will have a role in how much they can benefit from the technology. Speaking, though, is not the only option for communication for deaf and hard of hearing children. Language exposure, either signed or spoken, from birth builds and strengthens brain tissue that can be used in a variety of language contexts in the future. For example, if in the future the person undergoes surgery to receive a cochlear implant, their language exposure from birth may be an important factor in regards to acquisition of spoken language aided by the implant.

All too often, though, deaf and hard of hearing children do not follow the typical language development timeline. When a child is deprived of language from the beginning, they can be dramatically behind their peers in terms of hitting milestones. This can impact learning for the rest of their lives.

=== Age and quality of language exposure ===
The first five years of a child's life is a critical time for cognitive development and the establishment of their native language. This critical period deems the first few years of life as the period during which the brain is most primed for language development. The critical period is also referred to as the sensitive period for language development, or the language acquisition window. Studies on stroke in infancy and typical language development unveiled a critical period for language acquisition. After this critical period of language acquisition, it remains exceedingly laborious and strenuous to master a native language. Language development is not impossible after the five year mark, but will likely bear the cognitive and linguistic characteristics of language deprivation.

Timing and quality of language exposure, not language used or how many languages used, are the factors that matter most when determining language and literacy outcomes. When deaf and hard of hearing children are fully exposed to natural language along a timeline equivalent to their hearing peers, they will acquire language along equivalent milestones. This timeline includes babbling around 10 months and first sign around one year. The full timeline of children who use sign was published by Gallaudet University Press and is a resource that parents of deaf children can use to track their child's language development which includes milestones like following eye gaze, pointing, and imitating handshapes. This resource is unique because it is normed for deaf and hard-of-hearing children, and can be used to establish parent expectations for their child's language progress.

=== Critical period ===
The critical stage in language development is important in deaf individuals. Deaf individuals who lack exposure to sign language at a young age fail to achieve full language proficiency as they develop. Inconsistencies in exposure to a natural language during this critical period of language acquisition could result in persistent symptoms, known as language deprivation syndrome. Symptoms of language deprivation syndrome include language dysfluency (e.g., lack of fluency in native language), knowledge gaps about the world around them, abnormal thinking, mood and/or behavior disorders, academic, and literacy delays. It was found that deaf individuals who acquired sign language after five years of age were not nearly as proficient as deaf individuals who were exposed to sign language from birth.

==== Misconceptions of critical period ====
One misconception is that deaf children will be at a disadvantage since they lack access to auditory input and, therefore, deafness results in delayed development. Because of this, a focus on auditory language exposure for deaf children is usually recommended. However, deafness, or the lack of auditory input, is not a cause of delayed development, language deprivation is. Profoundly deaf children who had early exposure to a visual signed language possess high levels of language organization. If development of spoken language is desired, listening technology (hearing aids or cochlear implants) can help, but the overall process is enhanced when paired with sign language. These devices vary greatly in benefit to different hard of hearing and deaf individuals and do not guarantee better auditory understanding or speaking ability.

Other studies address the neurological differences between individuals who have experienced language deprivation and those who did not. The first five years of life are foundational for many skills as the brain develops the neural connections and processes that will be built upon for years to come. Without full access and exposure to natural language during the critical period, the brain does not have the tools it needs to build the typical framework for processing and producing language. In turn, language deprivation can cause abnormalities in other areas of cognitive functioning, particularly the establishment of concepts, processing things in a set order, and executive function. Similar results were seen in deaf individuals. Language deprivation influenced altered neural activation patterns in deaf individuals that were exposed to sign language later, as compared to deaf individuals who received typical language development.

==== Language acquisition in deaf children ====
Most children naturally learn their native language at a young age. Although spoken language is ubiquitous for children who hear normally, congenitally deaf children do not have access to it from birth. Less than 10% of the children with hearing loss are born into deaf families who use sign language as their main communication method. Signed languages are natural languages with linguistic features similar to spoken languages, and the developmental milestones are similar to those of spoken languages. Deaf and hard of hearing children with deaf parents who sign with them thus experience language from birth, like typically developing children with normal hearing. To succeed, children must acquire at least one language (spoken or signed). Some researchers and practitioners encourage families to focus exclusively on spoken language. There is also evidence that suggests that natural sign languages are beneficial to deaf and hard of hearing children.

=== Incidental learning and access to knowledge ===
When hearing individuals share information with each other in a way that is not accessible to deaf individuals, the deaf individuals are not privy to incidental learning experiences. Incidental learning refers to any unprompted, unplanned, or unintended learning. Hearing children typically learn incidentally when they overhear conversations between other family members in the home. This type of learning occurs in everyday communication including emotional expression, navigating arguments, and managing triggers. Language deprivation syndrome coupled with the lack of these every day incidental learning experiences may impact mental health, physical health, and academic advancements. A lack of incidental learning can also limit an individual's general wealth of knowledge and comprehension skills used to learn about and understand the world around them. Without the wealth of knowledge and language skills hearing children typically demonstrate, deaf and hard of hearing children can arrive at school already behind their peers. This trend can continue as they spend school years working to learn the things their hearing peers picked up effortlessly in the home before starting school. Incidental learning is possible for deaf and hard-of-hearing children when the family uses language that is fully accessible to all family members and includes the child with atypical hearing in family communications directly and indirectly.

=== Early accessible communication ===
The importance of early accessible communication with family and peers can be seen in "dinner table syndrome"—the experience of observing spoken conversations between other family members and not understanding these conversations. As statistics show, 90–95% of deaf children are born to hearing parents, thus, they may often experience this phenomenon if their family does not incorporate sign language into their communication. These parents may be unfamiliar with Deaf culture and are often unaware of the best communication methods to assist their children with developing into contributing members of society. A famous Deaf artist, Susan Dupor, painted an art piece called "Family Dog" to represent this experience. Her artwork represents the feeling of isolation being deaf in an all-hearing family. This painting was designed to emphasize deaf family members' perspectives with the blurred faces of the family metaphorically representing the difficulties of lip reading. Only 30–45% of the English language can be understood solely through lip reading. In these situations, deaf children are unable to participate in the conversations without using a commonly accessible language. Similarly, these experiences occur during social engagements where deaf individuals cannot communicate with other individuals through a spoken language.

== Prevention ==
=== Language ===
==== Modality ====
When it comes to language deprivation prevention, modality, which in this case means using either spoken or signed language, does not matter to the brain as long as it is fully accessible. Studies from Dr. Laura-Ann Petitto reveal that brain tissue used for language accepts both auditory and visual input to develop language pathways. This is because the brain focuses on patterns in language, whether it is a pattern of sounds or a pattern of hand movements. Access to the full range of patterns embedded in a language is key for developing strong language pathways in the brain. The brain connections developed in response to linguistic input can then be utilized if/when the child is exposed to a second language. Even in cases where the brain receives absolutely no auditory input, the brain is still able to develop typical language skills when exposed to high-quality visual language. Hearing technologies can also be used to grant spoken language access, though the quality of this access varies from person to person.

==== Methods ====
Communication methods used with deaf children may include spoken language, signed language, systems or philosophies such as cued speech, Signing Exact English, and other forms of manually coded language, as well as philosophies and techniques like simultaneous communication or total communication. Signed languages can provide the child with full language access, but they pose challenges to the family as they work to learn a new language. Manually coded language systems as well as philosophies like simultaneous communication or total communication are more closely linked to the spoken language used in the area and therefore are usually easier for acquisition by people whose native language is the spoken language of the area. However, these methods may not have the same linguistic characteristics as natural languages, such as morphology, phonology, syntax, and semantics.

Children whose parents opt for spoken language may use hearing technology to receive spoken language input and are encouraged to go to speech therapy to work on expressive language skills, leading them to speak and listen to language. Medical professionals could perform cochlear implant surgery on these individuals if elected, or audiologists could test residual hearing and order hearing aids. This method is often used by families who utilize spoken language at home and cannot or will not learn sign language. Modern research reveals that there is a wide range of results from this method as there are many background factors that impact the success of this method, such as family socioeconomic status, location, parental employment, quality of the language model at home, and the child's residual hearing.

==== Code switching ====
By prioritizing the child's visual and auditory language equally from birth, children are given every opportunity and tool to develop language. As children grow and become adults, they may naturally prefer one modality over the other, but will have developed useful skills in both. Code-switching allows bilingual individuals to experience all the benefits of each language they know. For deaf and hard of hearing children especially, a strong language foundation in a signed language paired with a spoken language (or written) sets the stage for literacy later on. In a study conducted with Deaf and hearing individuals, psychologists found that deaf children born to deaf parents were the most proficient at code-switching. In turn, deaf children born to hearing parents struggled more with the ability to code-switch and communicate in various conditions. Parents' hearing status and age that the child is exposed to language affect deaf children's ability to code-switch. Deaf children may lack proficiency or fluency in either language during early language-learning development, they still engage in code switching activities, in which they go back and forth between signing and English to communicate. Code switching from oral speech is difficult for Deaf children. Lexical borrowing and code switching do occur between sign and oral languages. Lexicon is similar to borrowing and oral speech to code switching.

==== Conflict and controversies ====
There has been much conflict and controversy regarding language modality for deaf and hard of hearing children. When it is discovered that a child is deaf or hard of hearing, this assessment is usually made via a hearing test in a medical setting. The first people the parents interact with after their child's hearing status is identified can be very influential. The Joint Committee on Infant Hearing recommends that professionals working with families of deaf infants should provide parents with unbiased, well-rounded information to help guide decisions they will need to make. Systemic bias towards deafness, known as audism, can impact what information and guidance parents receive. If a deaf child does not meet appropriate early benchmarks for the first chosen communication method or modality, it is important to consider additional or different methods, in order to prevent language delay, or in extreme cases, language deprivation.

=== Early intervention ===
Early intervention is one of the main methods of preventing language deprivation. A main focus of early intervention programs and services for deaf and hard of hearing children is language development. Early interventionists are able to work with the family during the early, critical years for language acquisition. Early intervention can take many forms and usually depends on where the family lives. In the United States, the School for the Deaf in the state the family lives in likely provides programs and resources. Other services can come from the state itself, national programs, and educational centers. These services may be paid for through state and federal funds. Independent organizations like the National Association of the Deaf and the American Society for Deaf Children in the United States and the National Deaf Children's Society in London can provide additional resources and support.

==== Deaf mentor ====
Children whose parents select the signed language route can benefit from signed language models, such as a Deaf mentor. Deaf mentors provide a role model for the child that they may not see anywhere else, as well as providing a language model for the whole family. Deaf mentors can help parents understand what their deaf child is capable of and establish high expectations for the child to fulfill their potential. When working with a Deaf mentor, the family typically takes signing classes and engages in Deaf community events in addition to working with the mentor. Everyone, including the child, learns to sign together and use their skills to communicate with one another with the mentor helping to facilitate mastery by being a native-level language model.

==== Success of early intervention ====
A team must be cooperative for the success of early intervention. Members of the early intervention team can include education and medical professionals, therapists (speech, occupational, physical, psychological), specialists (vision, hearing/deafness, family dynamics, and kinesthetic), the audiologist, a social worker, the interventionist, and the family. A Deaf mentor can also be included as a key member of the team. Early interventionists can also work with the family in the home through game play, language and communication instruction and activities, providing strategies, helping establish routines and discipline methods, and more. Home visits are one way early intervention can take place, but it is not limited to the home given the broad range of services provided. Geographic location of the family influences available services and resources due to distance, but virtual intervention measures have helped address this challenge.

Early intervention has also helped prevent language deprivation through newborn hearing screening. Before universal hearing screening was established in hospitals shortly after birth, many deaf children's hearing status was not identified until years after birth, when language milestones were not being met. At the time of identification, the child was already behind. Newborn hearing screening supports early identification and allows professionals to help keep the child's language development on track.

=== Legislation ===
Another way language deprivation can be prevented is through legislation providing standards for language access in deaf education. Globally, there are a number of laws and policies that relate to the topic of language deprivation. Other related laws in the United States focusing on special education including deaf education include national legislation such as the Americans with Disabilities Act (ADA), Individuals with Disabilities Education Act (IDEA), and the Rehabilitation Act of 1973.

==== LEAD-K ====
One current example of state legislation in the United States is LEAD-K, Language Equality & Acquisition for Deaf Kids. LEAD-K varies from state to state because each state is responsible for drafting its version of the bill. The main focus of LEAD-K is full language development in English, ASL, or both, for school readiness and the prevention of language deprivation. Twelve states have passed LEAD-K legislation as of August 5, 2019. The model bill for LEAD-K calls for five actions:

1. Create a resource for informal parental use to chart their deaf or hard of hearing children's language growth—this resource-based on milestones for specific language and English literacy development.
2. Provide a similar resource for educators that, instead of being created through LEAD-K, is chosen from current methods.
3. Distribute the parent and educator resources to relevant individuals and organizations and equip these recipients for its use.
4. Hold Individualized Education Program (IEP) and Individual Family Service Plan (IFSP) teams accountable for the child's language development progress.
5. Establish an advisory committee outline the model bills and the requirements for the composition to ensure the creation of a balanced, knowledgeable, and diverse team.

===== Controversies =====
LEAD-K has faced opposition from the American Speech-Language-Hearing Association (ASHA) and American Cochlear Implant Alliance (ACIA). Both groups released statements regarding their concerns about the parental choice of modality for their child. They argued that such legislation could negatively impact the services the child receives under IDEA. ACIA also argued that there was a lack of evidence suggesting that ASL benefits all children with a hearing loss. ASHA expressed its concern that parents might not receive information regarding all possible options and that the policy elevated one modality over all others. LEAD-K responded to these concerns by reiterating their commitment to deaf and hard of hearing children achieving age appropriate language milestones regardless of the language chosen by the parents and that they were not advocating for one modality over another.

One notable revision came via a collaboration between LEAD-K and the Alexander Graham Bell Association, a historically spoken-language-only group. These two traditionally opposed groups were able to reach an agreement by focusing on the shared desire to provide equal language acquisition opportunities for deaf and hard of hearing children as are received by their hearing peers and promote the spread of accurate and balanced information.

== Educational considerations ==
=== General education ===
One education placement for students who are deaf or hard of hearing is general education, also called mainstreaming. This method integrates students requiring special education services into a general education classroom based on their skills. The Individuals with Disabilities Education Act (IDEA) mandates the specificities of this integration. IDEA protects students who are typically a part of the special education classroom by granting the right to access the same education setting as their peers. The student also has a right to the school-provided accommodations and services necessary for them to be able to participate in the general education classroom. The student's needs, services, and goals are detailed in their Individualized Education Plan (IEP). All deaf and hard of hearing students have a right to access general education instruction at their local school with their peers, but it depends on the individual if this option will be the best fit.

==== Classroom accommodations ====
In terms of deaf students, deafness is considered a low-incidence disability. This translates to the possibility of one deaf child belonging to a classroom of all "hearing" children and can result in unique barriers. For example, teachers and students within the general education setting may not know sign language, causing significant communication and cultural barriers to social interaction, friendship, and learning. Accommodations such as sign language interpreters, communication access real-time translation (CART), or an FM system can help with some of these issues, but they will always be present. These accommodations work to increase access, but for students using sign language in general education settings, communication will be indirect since it is through the interpreter. There is always a risk of interpreting miscommunication and even with these accommodations, the learning and social interactions will be an obstacle.

Students who use hearing technology and spoken language can be supported by reducing classroom background noise, seating close to the instructor, and speakers who face the class while talking one at a time. Learning can be difficult when these conditions are not provided.

=== Bilingual–bicultural education ===
Deaf children without early access to signed language remain at risk for starting school unprepared for the rigors of academic learning. These different challenges of the deaf children for educational progress are not limited to those with their language exposure. That is where an educational philosophy known as the Bilingual-bicultural (Bi-Bi) method can benefit deaf students.

This approach began to emerge in schools during the late 1980s in the United States, Denmark, and Sweden. In the United States, the ASL/English Bi-Bi is designed to facilitate academic success and provide education to deaf students by teaching sign language as a first language, followed by a written or spoken language (such as English) as their second language. Furthermore, state schools specifically for the deaf offer exposure to Deaf culture—a unique facet not provided by general education. Through the Bi-Bi approach, deaf students may develop multiple cultural identities: one based on their hearing status and others based on that of their family or local majority culture.

This method aims to provide deaf and hard of hearing students with instruction in both signed and written languages and exposes students to both Deaf culture and other cultural contexts, i.e. the wider culture of the area or country. Bi-Bi emphasizes that deaf children learn visually and education should be provided through a visual language. Bi-Bi supporters argue because of the variability in cochlear implant and hearing aid outcomes, sign language access is crucial for preventing deaf and hard-of-hearing children from experiencing inequalities in education. However, since it is a method with a bilingual focus, the written form of the majority spoken language is given equal value. Deaf and hard of hearing students have a right to the same academic content as their peers and to literacy.

== See also ==
- Critical period
- Deaf education
- Language acquisition by deaf children
- Language deprivation experiments
