= John Miner (attorney) =

American prosecutor (1918–2011)

John Miner (December 20, 1918 in Cleveland Heights, Ohio, US – February 25, 2011 in Los Angeles) was most famous for being the Los Angeles prosecutor in charge of investigating the deaths of Marilyn Monroe, Robert F. Kennedy, and the Manson killings. In the case of Genie, a girl who had been locked in her house for 13 years and rendered unable to speak, he successfully defended Genie's mother in court on grounds that she was forced into acquiescence by an abusive husband. He was a Los Angeles County deputy district attorney from 1959 to 1970.
