= Anna (feral child) =

American feral child

- Born: Alice Marie Harris; March 6, 1932; Perryopolis, Pennsylvania, US
- Died: August 6, 1942 (aged 10)
- Burial place: Delaware Cemetery

Alice Marie Harris (March 6, 1932 – August 6, 1942), known under the pseudonym Anna, was an American feral child from Pennsylvania who was raised in isolation. She was abused for being an illegitimate child. From the age of five months to six years, she was kept strapped down in the attic of her home, malnourished and unable to speak or move. She was discovered and rescued in 1938, but died at the age of ten before she was able to fully recover from hemorrhagic jaundice. She is often compared to the feral children cases of Isabelle and Genie.

== Family ==
Anna was born March 6, 1932, in Perryopolis, Pennsylvania, about 17 miles (27 km) outside of Uniontown. She was the second illegitimate child of her mother, Martha, who was 27 at the time of her discovery. Martha lived with her father, David, a widower farmer who strongly disapproved of her indiscretions. David's other children included daughter Catherine and sons Jacob and Harold.

After Anna was found, Martha married a man named George I. Eisenhauer. David died at the age of 72 in 1948. Martha died in Philadelphia in 1959.

== Early life ==
Anna was born in a nurse's private home and was brought to the family farm, but shortly after was sent to live at Martha's friend's house. A local minister considered adopting her, but decided against it when he discovered she had vaginitis. At the age of three weeks, she was sent to live in a children's home. There, she was said to be "terribly galled and otherwise in very bad shape". After eight weeks in the home, Martha was called to come collect her. In her place, she sent a man and his wife to see her in hopes of adopting her, but the agency refused to give permission because they disapproved of the couple. Later, Martha came herself and gave her to the couple. A short time after, a social worker found her at this home and attempted to convince Martha and David to take her back. At this time, she was over four months old. She was taken to another children's home, where a medical examination revealed she had vaginitis, umbilical hernia, and a skin rash. She was sent to a private foster home after three weeks in the children's home.

Because Martha and David could not pay for the child's care, Anna was sent back to live on the family farm at the age of five and a half months. In an attempt to avoid her father's anger, Martha kept her in an attic-like room on the second floor. Martha was busy working on the farm during the day and occasionally went out at night. Anna was given only enough care to keep her alive and received no instruction or positive attention. She was fed virtually nothing but cow's milk and was strapped down to a chair or cot for the majority of her early life. An article in the New York Times stated that she had been kept in the attic room, which was without windows or ventilation, for two years, and then kept for three years more in the storage room in the second floor. However, a later report in the American Journal of Sociology by Kingsley Davis considers it “doubtful that the child's hands at the time of discovery were tied. It is more likely that she was confined to her crib in the first period of life and at all times kept locked in her room to keep her from falling down the steep stairs leading immediately from the door and to keep the grandfather from seeing her. It is doubtful if the child was ever kept in the attic, as the report also stated”.

When interviewed by officers, David Harris stated, "I made her keep it up there, care for it and feed it as a sort of punishment. I forgave her first [illegitimate child], but not the second". The same New York Times article quotes Martha: "My father wouldn't let me bring it downstairs. He said he didn't want to see it around. I had to run up and down, up and down, to feed and take care of it. I had to feed it all the time. It was awfully hard". The father's name was withheld, but Martha said he was a well-to-do farmer.

== Rescue ==
Anna was discovered around February 6, 1938, by E. M. Smith of the Western Pennsylvania Humane Society about seventeen miles from Uniontown. The humane officer found her after a report had been filed from the Woman's Club of Star Junction. Other reports had also been spread that a child was kept in the house, yet she was never seen by visitors. When she was found, the Humane officer reported that: "The child was dressed in a dirty shirt and napkin. Her hands, arms, and legs were just bones, with skin drawn over them, so frail she couldn't use them. She never grew normally, and the chair on which she lay, half reclining and half sitting was so small the child had to double her legs partly under her". The chair that she was found in was tilted backwards to lean on a coal bucket with her arms tied above her head, leaving her unable to talk or move. Charges of negligence to a minor were brought against David and Martha. David's trial was held in March of 1938, and ended when Judge J. Russell Carr dismissed the case for lack of evidence. Martha's trial was due to be held after David's, but it is unclear if it ever took place. Dr John Kerr of Connellsville testified at David's trial. He declared: "it was about the most deplorable condition I have ever seen in all those years". He testified Anna had a severe lack of muscle, abnormal bones, and that she couldn't see or hear. He believed that, had she been properly nourished, she would have been a "normal" child. Martha claimed that she tried feeding her meat and other solid foods but that they made her gag. She denied the statements that she had been kept imprisoned in an attic.

== Recovery ==
When Anna was first rescued, Drs. J. F. Kerr and D. F. Newell assessed that she was undernourished, that the bones in her legs were softened and twisted out of normal shape and that she was suffering from rickets. She was also believed to be deaf as she didn't respond to others. It was later discovered as she recovered that the deafness was functional rather than organic. She additionally could not walk, talk, and showed few signs of intelligence. Once she was determined a ward of the county and placed in the Fayette County Home, she began improving rapidly. She had gained seven pounds by the end of summer 1938 but continued to struggle with simple speech and walking. She was enrolled in the Margaret Duer Judge school for "sub-normal" children. By the age of 9, she began developing signs of speech and was approaching social norms. She could respond to simple commands, feed herself, and remember some people, but she still could not speak, and had the approximate intelligence of a 1-year-old child.

A report filed on November 6, 1939 describes her state as follows: "Anna walks about aimlessly, makes periodic rhythmic motions of her hands, and, at intervals, makes guttural and sucking noises. She regards her hands as if she had seen them for the first time. It was impossible to hold her attention for more than a few seconds at a time-not because of distraction due to external stimuli but because of her inability to concentrate. She ignored the task in hand to gaze vacantly about the room. Speech is entirely lacking. Numerous unsuccessful attempts have been made with her in the hope of developing initial sounds. I do not believe that this failure is due to negativism or deafness but that she is not sufficiently developed to accept speech at this time...The prognosis is not favorable".

The last report filed regarding Anna, dated June 22, 1942, said that she could follow directions, identify a few colors, build with blocks, and differentiate between attractive and unattractive pictures. She had a good sense of rhythm and loved a doll. She talked mainly in phrases but would repeat words and try to carry on conversation. She habitually washed her hands and brushed her teeth.

== Death ==
Anna died on August 6, 1942, 5 months after her 10th birthday. Her death was caused by hemorrhagic jaundice, a form of jaundice in which injury and anemia are present. There is no cited evidence that her condition was linked to her isolation followed by pneumonia. The Fayette County commissioners paid for her funeral and burial in Delaware Cemetery, near the Judge School in Milford where she had last lived.

== Comparisons to other cases ==
=== Isabelle ===
Anna's case is commonly compared to the study of another feral child named Isabelle, due to similarities in the girls' upbringings. They were both raised in isolation for a similar amount of time, but Isabelle was able to recover much faster and achieve greater mental development. She was born one month after Anna and was discovered nine months after her. Similarly to her, Isabelle was forced into isolation because she was an illegitimate child. During her six and a half years of isolation, she lived with her deaf and mute mother. She had no concept of relationships, no verbal skills, and was malnourished. Following her discovery, she was hospitalized and her apathetic behavior was closely monitored. She was then transferred to a ward with children where she became socialized and learned to imitate the other children. She also began language training with a skilled team of doctors and within eighteen months had gained the understanding and use of an estimated 1500–2500 words, enabling her to produce complex sentences and correctly use inflection morphology, pronouns, and prepositions by the age of eight.

As soon as a year and a half after her discovery, Isabelle was energetic and fully mobile. By fourteen, she was excelling in public school. Her recovery is clearly different from Anna's. Both girls were deemed to have very low intellectual abilities when they were discovered and introduced into the world. Their differences arise, however, when one considers that two years after Isabelle's discovery she was deemed to be recovered and a fully functioning girl, but prior to Anna's death she only ever reached the level of socialization of a two or three-year-old child. The different rates and degrees of recovery between the two girls is suspected to be a result of one of two things. First is that Anna was suspected of having lower mental capabilities from birth, a condition that was exacerbated by her long period of isolation. The other theory is that Anna received a lesser standard of care and verbal training during her recovery as compared to what Isabelle's team of skilled doctors and physiologists offered her. Some also attribute Isabelle's more successful recovery to the fact that she was in isolation with her mother. However, the exact reason is hard to pinpoint, since Anna died before this could be investigated any further.

=== Genie ===
Another case Anna is commonly compared to is Genie. While growing up, her father became convinced that she was severely intellectually disabled. By the time she was approximately 20 months old, this belief of his caused him to keep her as socially isolated as possible until she was found by welfare workers at 13 years and 7 months old. During this period of isolation, her father forbade anyone from interacting with her, keeping her bound to a crib, locked alone in a room, and left her severely malnourished and unable to mobilize. Similarly to Anna, the extent of her isolation prevented her from being exposed to any significant amount of speech or human interaction, and as a result she did not acquire language during her childhood. Her abuse came to the attention of Los Angeles child welfare authorities on November 4, 1970.

Following her discovery, Genie was followed by scientists, physiologists, and linguists. She has lived much longer than Anna and is believed to be 60 or 61 years old (as of 2017), but she has yet to acquire a functional first language. Unlike Anna, psychologists and linguists continue to frequently discuss her to this day, and there is considerable academic and media interest in her development and the research team's methods, since her case has demonstrated the necessity of early language stimulation in the left hemisphere of the brain to start. The discoveries made through her following and scientific testing relate to Anna, explaining that Anna's lack of language stimulation during her isolated childhood are why she was never able to acquire the typical verbal communication skills for a child her age.
