= RAPGEF5 =

Protein-coding gene in the species Homo sapiens

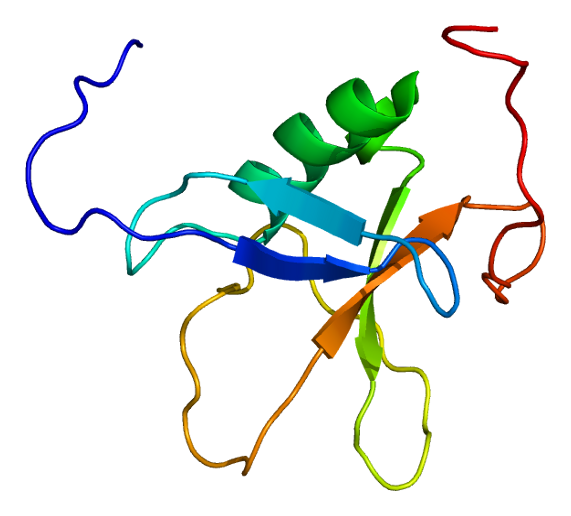

Identifiers
- Aliases: RAPGEF5, GFR, MR-GEF, REPAC, Rap guanine nucleotide exchange factor 5, MRGEF
- External IDs: OMIM: 609527; MGI: 2444365; GeneCards: RAPGEF5
Available structures
| PDB | Ortholog search: PDBe RCSB |
| PDB | List of PDB id codes 1WGY |

Gene location (Human)
| Chr. | Chromosome 7 (human) |
| Band | 7p15.3 | Start | 22,118,236 bp |
| Band | 7p15.3 | End | 22,357,154 bp |

Gene location (Mouse)
| Chr. | Chromosome 12 (mouse) |
| Band | 12|12 F2 | Start | 117,480,099 bp |
| Band | 12|12 F2 | End | 117,723,472 bp |
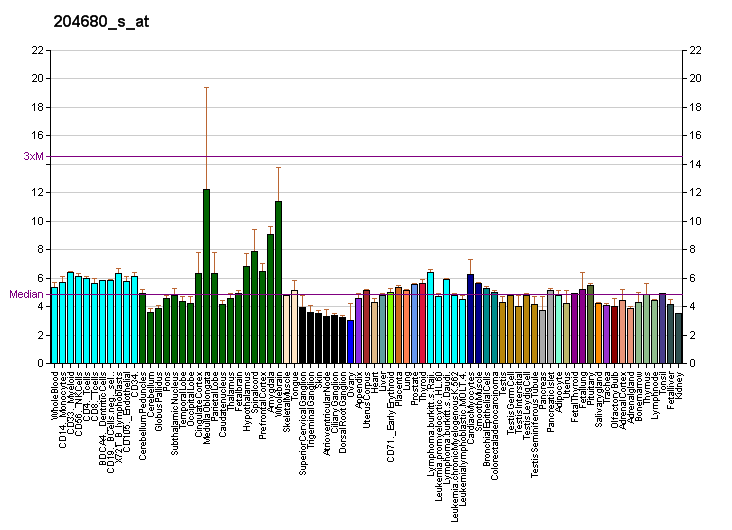
RNA expression pattern
| Bgee | Human / Mouse (ortholog); Top expressed in: inferior ganglion of vagus nerve; pons; inferior olivary nucleus; corpus callosum; superior vestibular nucleus; pars reticulata; subthalamic nucleus; postcentral gyrus; external globus pallidus; dorsal motor nucleus of vagus nerve / Top expressed in: superior cervical ganglion; otolith organ; utricle; anterior amygdaloid area; right lung; lateral septal nucleus; zygote; left lung lobe; oocyte; secondary oocyte; More reference expression data |
| BioGPS | More reference expression data |
Gene ontology
| Molecular function | GTP-dependent protein binding; guanyl-nucleotide exchange factor activity |
| Cellular component | nucleus; nucleoplasm; nuclear body |
| Biological process | small GTPase mediated signal transduction; nervous system development |
Sources:Amigo / QuickGO
Orthologs
| Databases | NCBI: entry; OMA: entry |
| Species | Human | Mouse |
| Entrez | 9771 | 217944 |
| Ensembl | ENSG00000136237 | ENSMUSG00000041992 |
| UniProt | Q92565 | Q8C0Q9 |
| RefSeq (mRNA) | NM_012294; NM_001367600; NM_001367601; NM_001367602; NM_001367603 | NM_175930; NM_001373989 |
| RefSeq (protein) | NP_036426; NP_001354529; NP_001354530; NP_001354531; NP_001354532 | NP_787126; NP_001360918 |
| Location (UCSC) | Chr 7: 22.12 – 22.36 Mb | Chr 12: 117.48 – 117.72 Mb |
| PubMed search |
- Wikidata
| View/Edit Human | View/Edit Mouse |

Rap guanine nucleotide exchange factor 5 is a protein that in humans is encoded by the RAPGEF5 gene.

Members of the RAS subfamily (see HRAS; MIM 190020) of GTPases function in signal transduction as GTP/GDP-regulated switches that cycle between inactive GDP- and active GTP-bound states. Guanine nucleotide exchange factors (GEFs), such as RAPGEF5, serve as RAS activators by promoting acquisition of GTP to maintain the active GTP-bound state and are the key link between cell surface receptors and RAS activation (Rebhun et al., 2000).[supplied by OMIM]
