= Language deprivation experiments =

Isolating infants from normal language

Language deprivation experiments have been claimed to have been attempted at least four times throughout history, isolating infants from the normal use of spoken or signed language in an attempt to discover the fundamental character of human nature or the origin of language.

The American literary scholar Roger Shattuck called this kind of research study the "forbidden experiment" because of the exceptional deprivation of ordinary human contact it requires. Although not designed to study language, similar experiments on primates (labelled the "pit of despair") utilising complete social deprivation resulted in serious psychological disturbances.

== In history ==
An early record of a study of this kind can be found in Herodotus's Histories. According to Herodotus (c. 485–425 BC), the Egyptian pharaoh Psamtik I (664–610 BC) carried out such a study, and concluded that the Phrygians must antedate the Egyptians since the child had first spoken something similar to the Phrygian word bekos, meaning "bread". Recent researchers suggest this was likely a willful interpretation of the child's babbling.

An experiment allegedly carried out by Holy Roman Emperor Frederick II in the 13th century saw young infants raised without human interaction in an attempt to determine if there was a natural language that they might demonstrate once their voices matured. It is claimed he was seeking to discover what language would have been imparted into Adam and Eve by God. The experiments were recorded by the monk Salimbene di Adam in his Chronicles, who was generally extremely negative about Frederick II (portraying his calamities as parallel to the Biblical plagues in The Twelve Calamities of Emperor Frederick II) and wrote that Frederick encouraged "foster-mothers and nurses to suckle and bathe and wash the children, but in no ways to prattle or speak with them; for he would have learnt whether they would speak the Hebrew language (which he took to have been the first), or Greek, or Latin, or Arabic, or perchance the tongue of their parents of whom they had been born. But he laboured in vain, for the children could not live without clappings of the hands, and gestures, and gladness of countenance, and blandishments."

A few centuries after Frederick II's alleged experiment, James IV of Scotland was said to have sent two children to be raised by a mute woman isolated on the island of Inchkeith, to determine if language was learned or innate. The children were reported to have spoken good Hebrew, but historians were sceptical of these claims soon after they were made.

Mughal emperor Akbar was later said to have children raised by mute wetnurses. Akbar held that speech arose from hearing; thus children raised without hearing human speech would become mute. The building became known as the "dumb house." When Akbar visited the place in 1582, four years after the children were first interred, he heard "no cry... nor any speech... no talisman of speech, and nothing came out except the noise of the dumb."

Some authors have doubted whether or how exactly the experiments of Psamtik I and James IV actually took place; and probably the same goes for that of Frederick II. Akbar's study is most likely authentic, but offers an ambiguous outcome.

Most examples of language deprivation "experiments" were case studies where human children raised in deprivation were studied after the fact rather than chosen beforehand in a designed experiment.

== In fiction ==
- 1963: In The Twilight Zone episode "Mute", several children are raised in such a manner to foster telepathic communication.
- 1984: Government workers in Suzette Haden Elgin's feminist science fiction novel Native Tongue kidnap an infant to expose it only to an alien language in the hopes it will become the first human to understand it; the experiment fails.
- 1985: The "forbidden experiment" occurs in Paul Auster's The New York Trilogy.
- 1999: In the Batgirl comic series, the title character, Cassandra Cain, is deprived of spoken language during childhood. This was part of an attempt to create a martial artist with an exceptional ability to interpret body language, as it was believed that this would give one a great advantage in close combat.
- 2009: In Le Miroir de Cassandre by Bernard Werber, the title character Cassandre and her older brother are deprived of spoken language during a part of their childhood as an experiment from their mother, a famous paedopsychologist.
- 2010: In Ian Tregillis's Milkweed Triptych, a trilogy of novels starting with Bitter Seeds, groups of children were raised in utter silence so they would learn a mystical language that let them summon and bargain with the extradimensional "eidolons" for supernatural power.
- 2018: In Andrea Moro's first novel Il segreto di Pietramala, an entire village in Corsica undergoes the forbidden experiment. The novel won the Flaiano Prizes.

== See also ==
- Adamic language
- Critical period hypothesis
- Feral child
- Language deprivation
- Language deprivation in children with hearing loss
