= Feature detection =

Feature detection or feature detectors may refer to:

- Feature detection (nervous system), a biological process for interpreting sensory input
  - Orientation column, also known as a "feature detection column"
- Feature detection (computer vision), methods for finding parts of an image relevant to a computational task
- Feature detection (web development), determining whether a computing environment has specific functionality
