= Perceptual narrowing =

Perceptual narrowing is a developmental process during which the brain uses environmental experiences to shape perceptual abilities. This process improves the perception of things that people experience often and causes them to experience a decline in the ability to perceive some things to which they are not often exposed. This phenomenon is a result of neuroplasticity, including Hebbian learning and synaptic pruning. Through these mechanisms, neural pathways that are more consistently used are strengthened, making them more efficient, while those pathways that are unused become less efficient. This process is most evident during sensitive periods of development. The prevailing theory is that human infants are born with the ability to sense a wide variety of stimuli, and as they age, they begin to selectively narrow these perceptions by categorizing them in a more socio-culturally relevant way. Most of the research in this area focuses on facial discrimination and phoneme distinction in human infants. However, other work has found that perceptual narrowing also occurs for music and sign language perception. Perceptual narrowing has also been implicated in synaesthesia.

== Facial discrimination ==
=== Cross racial ===
Most of the research done to date in the area of perceptual narrowing involves facial processing studies conducted with infants. Using a preferential looking procedure in cross racial studies, Caucasian infants were tested on their ability to distinguish two faces from four different racial groups. Facial prompts were presented from their own racial group, as well as, African, Asian, and Middle Eastern. At three months of age, infants were able to show recognition for familiar faces from all racial groups, but by six months, a pattern was beginning to emerge where the infants could only recognize faces from the Caucasian or Chinese groups—groups they had more familiarity with. At nine months, recognition took place only in the own-race group. These cross race studies provide strong evidence that children do start out with cross racial recognition abilities but as they age, they quickly begin to organize the data and select the stimuli that is most familiar to them, typically own-race faces.

=== Cross species ===
Cross species studies have been conducted where human infants at 6 months of age were familiarized with individual monkeys. When the monkey faces were associated with unique proper name labels, the infants maintained their ability to discriminate between them when retested at nine months of age. If the exposure was just to monkey faces in general, without name labels, the infants were unable to discriminate between them when retested at the nine months mark. This research shows that the individuation process helps to shape and maintain discrimination abilities for categories of familiarity, and is instrumental in the recognition of familiar faces later in life. It also highlights the importance of experience in perceptual narrowing.

Infants showed similar results to non-primate species such as cats and dogs at the ages of three to four months of age, however without the confirmation of whether or not the ability to discriminate decreases as development occurs after nine months.

== Phoneme distinction ==
At birth, infants have broad abilities to detect similarities and differences among languages. The phonemes of different languages sound distinct to infants less than six months of age, but as the infant grows and their brain develops, they become less able to distinguish phonemes of non-native languages and more responsive to their native language. This is presumably due to infants experiencing their native language often, while not getting much experience with non-native languages. Research suggests that this perceptual narrowing phenomenon occurs within the first year of life. Infants aged 6–8 months have a greater ability to distinguish between non-native sounds in comparison to infants who are 8–10 months of age. Near the end of 12 months, infants are beginning to understand and produce speech in their native language, and by the end of the first year of life infants detect these phonemic distinctions at low levels that are similar to that of adults.

== Neural mechanisms ==
Brain plasticity is responsible for this "tuning" of infants' perceptual ability. While plasticity is evident throughout the human lifespan, it occurs most often at younger ages, during sensitive periods of development. This is a function of synaptic pruning, a mechanism of plasticity where the overall number of neurons and neural pathways are reduced, leaving only the most commonly used—and most efficient—neural pathways. These pathways are also more myelinated which increases the speeds at which processing occurs. Evidence suggests that perceptual narrowing, especially phoneme distinction, is heavily reliant on infants' social interaction with the adults in their environment; this is referred to as the "social gating hypothesis". The Social Gating Hypothesis suggests that social interaction creates an optimal learning environment for infants, an environment that introduces learning through social context. Social Gating might function in a number of ways; for example, by increasing infants' attention or arousal, increasing infants' sense of relationship, and by strengthening an infant's link between perception and action.

== Synaesthesia ==
Synaesthesia is a condition in which the stimulation of one sense evokes an additional stimulation in another sense, such as a tone (auditory stimulation) evoking the experience of color or shapes (visual stimulation). Some research suggests that infants universally have this experience due to the greater number of functional synaptic connections across sensory domains compared to adults, and that over the course of normal development this experience dissipates through the process of perceptual narrowing. There is evidence that a failure in the perceptual narrowing process can, in rare cases, lead to adult synaethesia.

== See also ==
- Developmental plasticity
- Hebbian learning
- Neuroplasticity
- Neuroscience
- Phoneme
