= The Myth of the First Three Years =

1999 book by John Bruer

- Author: John Bruer
- Language: English
- Genre: Non-fiction
- Publication date: 1999
- ISBN: 978-0-7432-4260-8

The Myth of the First Three Years: A New Understanding of Early Brain Development and Lifelong Learning (ISBN 978-0-7432-4260-8, 1999) is a book written by John Bruer. The book explains the exaggerations of basic critical period research in neuroscience "resulting in a potentially disproportionate channeling of resources toward early childhood education."

== First three years ==
The book discusses the myths surrounding early childhood development, in particular, the myth that "the first three years of a baby's life determine whether or not the child will grow into a successful, thinking person." According to a review: "Parents have been sold a bill of goods that is highly destructive because it overemphasizes infant and toddler nurturing to the detriment of long-term parental and educational responsibilities."

== See also ==
- Critical period hypothesis
