= TMEM260 =

Protein-coding gene in the species Homo sapiens

Identifiers
- Aliases: TMEM260, C14orf101, transmembrane protein 260, SHDRA
- External IDs: OMIM: 617449; MGI: 2443219; HomoloGene: 49506; GeneCards: TMEM260; OMA:TMEM260 - orthologs

Gene location (Human)
Chr.	Chromosome 14 (human)
Band	14q22.3	Start	56,488,354 bp
Band	14q22.3	End	56,650,606 bp

Gene location (Mouse)
Chr.	Chromosome 14 (mouse)
Band	14|14 C1	Start	48,683,581 bp
Band	14|14 C1	End	48,761,703 bp
RNA expression pattern
Bgee	Human / Mouse (ortholog); Top expressed in: corpus epididymis; caput epididymis; tail of epididymis; sperm; endometrium; corpus callosum; mucosa of paranasal sinus; trabecular bone; testicle; jejunal mucosa / Top expressed in: neural layer of retina; genital tubercle; tail of embryo; right kidney; zygote; granulocyte; proximal tubule; ventricular zone; secondary oocyte; yolk sac; More reference expression data
BioGPS	n/a
Orthologs
Species	Human	Mouse
Entrez	54916	218989
Ensembl	ENSG00000070269	ENSMUSG00000036339
UniProt	Q9NX78	Q8BMD6
RefSeq (mRNA)	NM_017799	NM_172600; NM_001310584
RefSeq (protein)	NP_060269	NP_001297513; NP_766188
Location (UCSC)	Chr 14: 56.49 – 56.65 Mb	Chr 14: 48.68 – 48.76 Mb
PubMed search
- Wikidata
View/Edit Human	View/Edit Mouse

TMEM260 is a protein that in humans is encoded by the TMEM260 gene. The function of TMEM260 is not yet clearly understood. TMEM260 is also known as UPF0679, c14orf101, and FLJ0392.

== Gene ==
=== Location ===
TMEM260 is located on band 22.3 on the small arm of human chromosome 14. The genomic sequence begins at 56,955,072 bp and ends at 57,117,324 bp on chromosome 14. The gene's genomic size is 162,253 bp. The mRNA size for TMEM260 is 4,278 bp. and made up of 15 exons.

=== Gene neighborhood ===
There are four other genes in the neighborhood of TMEM260. Two genes lie upstream of TMEM260, including LINC00520, which is the long intergenic non-protein coding RNA gene 520 gene, and PELI2 which is the pellino E3 ubiquitin protein ligase family member 2 gene. Downstream lies one pseudogene, RPL36AP1, and a gene OTX2, which is the orthodenticle homeobox 2 gene.

=== Conserved domains ===
TMEM260 contains one conserved domain, DUF2723. The domain DUF2723 is conserved back to bacteria and its function is not known.

=== Homology ===
TMEM260 is conserved throughout many species. Orthologs can be found throughout all Eukaryotes, Viridiplantae, Fungi, Protists, Bacteria and Eubacteria. No paralogs have yet been found.

=== Isoforms ===
There are two known isoforms for TMEM260 which produced by alternative splicing. Their uniprot IDs are Q9NX78-1 and Q9NX78-2. Isoform 1 consists of all 707 amino acids in the entire protein sequence, which is made up of 15 exons. Isoform 2 is spliced at amino acid 286 with the 3’ end truncated so that it contains only the first 7 exons in the sequence. It weighs only 30,707 Da.

== Protein ==
=== General properties ===
The protein TMEM260 consists of 707 amino acids with a predicted molecular weight of 79,536 Da. The protein has an isoelectric point of 8.4. TMEM260 is a multi-pass membrane protein which includes 8 helical transmembrane domains.

=== Conservation ===
The amino acid sequence for TMEM260 is highly conserved in mammals, having around 86% to 100% sequence similarity. Birds, frogs, and lizards also have a high degree of similarity to the human TMEM260 sequence with similarities between 76% and 83%. Fish have between 56% and 66% sequence similarity. Algae have around 52% sequence similarity while diatoms have only 39%. Though mammals contain a very high degree of sequence similarity and other animals show a fairly high degree of sequence similarity, other species such as algae, diatoms, and bacteria have gaps and 3’ end truncations. The segment of the TMEM260 sequence that is highly conserved in organisms as far back as algae, diatoms, and bacteria is the conserved domain DUF2723.

Genus and species name	Common name	Protein Accession Number	Sequence length (amino acids)	Sequence identity to human protein	Sequence similarity to human protein
Homo sapiens	Humans	NP_060269	707		
Pan troglodytes	Chimpanzee	XP_522861	707	99%	99%
Canis familiaris	Dog	XP_003930546	707	91%	95%
Loxodonta africana	Elephant	XP_00340871	707	90%	94%
Mus musculus	Mouse	NP_76188	707	82%	90%
Ornithorhynchus Anatinus	Platypus	XP_001520783	549	75%	86%
Taeniopygia guttata	Zebra finch	XP_00200425	705	71%	83%
Xenopus tropicalis	Frog	XP _002933788	687	66%	81%
Anolis carolinensis	Lizard	XP_003228513	730	65%	76%
Danio rerio	Zebra fish	XP_688103	740	48%	66%
Guillardia theta	Alga	EKX49772	733	36%	52%
Thalassiosira pseudonana	Diatom	XP_972174.2	716	25%	39%

=== Post translation modifications ===
The TMEM260 protein undergoes several different kinds of post translational modifications. These include N-terminal Acetylation, N-Glycosylation, and Phosphorylation.
