= Developmental plasticity =

Neural connection changes in childhood

Developmental plasticity refers to changes in neural connections during growth, influenced by environmental interactions and learning. Similar to brain plasticity, it specifically involves how neurons and synapses adapt during development. Most of these connections form from birth to early childhood, following three main processes, with critical periods determining lasting changes. The term can also describe how an embryo or larva adjusts its traits based on the environment. Unlike phenotypic plasticity, which can be reversible in adulthood, developmental plasticity shapes traits early in life that usually remain permanent.

== Mechanisms ==
Time-lapse video of a developing dendrite.

During development, the central nervous system acquires information via endogenous or exogenous factors as well as learning experiences. In acquiring and storing such information, the plastic nature of the central nervous system allows for the adaptation of existing neural connections in order to accommodate new information and experiences, resulting in developmental plasticity. According to Turrigiano (2012), this form of plasticity that occurs during development is the result of three predominant mechanisms: synaptic and homeostatic plasticity, and learning. When brain areas are impaired, remaining circuits can reorganize to compensate for lost functions. Additionally, adult neuroplasticity allows for continuous learning and memory formation. Factors such as age, environment, and experience influence the extent of plasticity, with enriched environments enhancing cognitive function. These changes are driven by mechanisms like synaptic plasticity, which strengthens or weakens synapses based on activity, homeostatic plasticity, which maintains neural stability, and learning-induced plasticity, which adapts neural circuits in response to new experiences.

=== Synaptic plasticity ===
Phenotypic plasticity is the ability of an organism to change its physical traits, behavior, or physiology in response to environmental conditions. This adaptability allows a single genotype to produce different phenotypes depending on the environment, helping organisms survive and reproduce in varying or changing habitats. For example, some plants can grow taller in low-light conditions to reach sunlight, while certain animals may change their coloration with the seasons for better camouflage. Phenotypic plasticity plays a crucial role in evolution and ecological interactions.

=== Synaptic plasticity ===
The underlying principle of synaptic plasticity is that synapses undergo an activity-dependent and selective strengthening or weakening so that new information can be stored. Synaptic plasticity depends on numerous factors including the threshold of the presynaptic stimulus in addition to the relative concentrations of neurotransmitter molecules. Synaptic plasticity has long been implicated for its role in memory storage and is thought to play a key role in learning. However, during developmental periods, synaptic plasticity is of particular importance, as changes in the network of synaptic connections can ultimately lead to changes in developmental milestones. For instance, the initial overproduction of synapses during development is key to plasticity that occurs in the visual and auditory cortices. In experiments conducted by Hubel and Wiesel, the visual cortex of kittens exhibits synaptic plasticity in the refinement of neural connections following visual inputs. Correspondingly, in the absence of such inputs during development, the visual field fails to develop properly and can lead to abnormal structures and behavior. Furthermore, research suggests that this initial overproduction of synapses during developmental periods provides the foundation by which many synaptic connections can be formed, thus resulting in more synaptic plasticity. In the same way that synapses are abundant during development, there are also refining mechanisms that assist in the maturation of synapses in neural circuits. This regulatory process allows the strengthening of important or frequently used synaptic connections while reducing the amount of weak connections.

=== Homeostatic plasticity ===
In order to maintain balance, homeostatic controls exist to regulate the overall activity of neural circuits, specifically by regulating the destabilizing effects of developmental and learning processes that result in changes of synaptic strength. Homeostatic plasticity also helps regulate prolonged excitatory responses, which lead to a reduction in all of a neuron's synaptic responses. Numerous pathways have recently been associated with homeostatic plasticity, though there is still no clear molecular mechanism. Synaptic scaling is one method that serves as a type of autoregulation, as neurons can recognize their own firing rates and notice when there are alterations; calcium-dependent signals control the levels of glutamate receptors at synaptic sites in response. Homeostatic mechanisms may be local or network-wide.

=== Learning ===
While synaptic plasticity is considered to be a by-product of learning, learning involves interaction with the environment to acquire the new information or behavior; synaptic plasticity merely represents the change in strength or configuration of neural circuits. Learning is crucial, as there is considerable interaction with the environment, which is when the potential for acquiring new information is greatest. By depending largely upon selective experiences, neural connections are altered and strengthened in a manner that is unique to those experiences. Experimentally, this can be seen when rats are raised in an environment that allows ample social interaction, resulting in increased brain weight and cortical thickness. In contrast, the inverse is seen following rearing in an environment devoid of interaction. Also, learning plays a considerable role in the selective acquisition of information and is markedly demonstrated when children develop one language instead of another. Another example of such experience-dependent plasticity that is critical during development is the occurrence of imprinting. This occurs as a result of a young child or animal being exposed to a novel stimulus and rapidly implementing a certain behavior in response.

== Neural development ==
The formation of the nervous system is one of the most crucial events in the developing embryo. The differentiation of stem cell precursors into specialized neurons gives rise to the formation of synapses and neural circuits, which is key to the principle of plasticity. During this pivotal point in development, consequent developmental processes like the differentiation and specialization of neurons are highly sensitive to exogenous and endogenous factors. For example, in utero exposure to nicotine has been linked to adverse effects, such as severe physical and cognitive deficits, due to the impediment of the normal acetylcholine receptor activation. In a recent study, the connection between such nicotine exposure and prenatal development was assessed. It was determined that nicotine exposure in early development can have a lasting and encompassing effect on neuronal structures, underlying the behavioral and cognitive defects observed in exposed humans and animals. Additionally, when proper synaptic function is disrupted through nicotine exposure, the overall circuit may become less sensitive and responsive to stimuli, resulting in compensatory developmental plasticity. It is for this reason that exposure to various environmental factors during developmental periods can cause profound effects on subsequent neural functioning.

=== Neural refinement and connectivity ===
Initial stages of neural development begin early on in the fetus with spontaneous firing of the developing neuron. These early connections are weak and often overlap at the terminal ends of the arbors. The young neurons have complete potential of changing morphology during a time span classified as the critical period to achieve strengthened and refined synaptic connections. It is during this time that damaged neuronal connections can become functionally recovered. Large alterations in length and location of these neurons can occur until synaptic circuitry is further defined. Although organization of neural connections begins at the earliest stages of development, activity-driven refinement only begins at birth when the individual neurons can be recognized as separate entities and start to enhance in specificity. The gradual pruning of the initially blurry axonal branching occurs via competitive and facilitative mechanisms, relying on electrical activity at the synapses; axons that fire independently of each other tend to compete for territory, whereas axons that synchronously fire mutually amplify connections. Until this architecture has been established, retinal focus remains diffuse. Perpetuation of these newly formed connections or the lack thereof depends on maintenance of electrical activities at the synapses. Upon refinement, the elaborate connections narrow and strengthen to fire only in response to specific stimuli to optimize visual acuity. These mechanisms can malfunction with the introduction of toxins, which bind to sodium channels and suppress action potentials and consequently electrical activity between synapses.

Quantification of synaptic networks has primarily been through retinal wave detection using Ca^{2+} fluorescent indicators. Prior to birth, retinal waves are seen to originate as clusters that propagate through the refractory region. These assays have been shown to provide spatiotemporal data on the random bursts of action potentials produced in a refractory period. Another assay recently developed to assess the depth of neuronal connections utilizes the trans-neuronal spread of rabies. This method of tracing employs the migration of a neurotropic virus through tightly interconnected neurons and specific site labeling of distinct connections. Patch-clamping experiments and calcium imaging are often conducted based on preliminary results from this assay in order to detect spontaneous neuronal activity. A method for in vitro synaptic quantification has been developed that uses immunofluorescence to measure synaptic density in different cell cultures.

== Critical period ==
The concept of critical periods is a widely accepted and prominent theme in development, with strong implications for developmental plasticity. Critical periods establish a time frame in which the shaping of neural networks can be carried out. During these critical periods in development, plasticity occurs as a result of changes in the structure or function of developing neural circuits. Such critical periods can also be experience-dependent, in the instance of learning via new experiences, or can be independent of the environmental experience and rely on biological mechanisms including endogenous or exogenous factors. Another notable example includes the development of sensory systems, which also undergo plastic changes during critical time periods. A lesser known example, however, remains the critical development of respiratory control during developmental periods. At birth, the development of respiratory control neural circuits is incomplete, requiring complex interactions from both the environment and intrinsic factors. Experimentally exposing two-week-old kittens and rats to hyperoxic conditions completely eliminates the carotid chemoreceptor response to hypoxia, resulting in respiratory impairment. This has remarkable clinical significance, as newborn infants are often supplemented with considerable amounts of oxygen, which could detrimentally affect the way in which neural circuits for respiratory control develop during the critical period. When stimuli appear or experiences occur outside of the critical period, any potential outcome is typically not long-lasting.

== Spontaneous network activity ==
Another lesser known element of developmental plasticity includes spontaneous bursts of action potentials in developing neural circuits, also referred to as spontaneous network activity. During the early development of neural connections, excitatory synapses undergo spontaneous activation, resulting in elevated intracellular calcium levels that signal the onset of numerous signaling cascades and developmental processes. For example, prior to birth, neural circuits in the retina undergo spontaneous network activity, which has been found to elicit the formation of retinogeniculate connections. Developmental spontaneous network activity is also exhibited in the proper formation of neuromuscular circuits. It is believed that spontaneous network activity establishes a scaffold for subsequent learning and information acquisition following the initial establishment of synaptic connections during development.

== Phenotypic plasticity ==
=== Reaction norms ===
Graphical representation of a reaction norm, which determines distribution of potential phenotypes.

The norm of reaction, or reaction norm, is a pattern of phenotypic plasticity that describes how a single genotype can produce an array of different phenotypes in response to different environmental conditions. Furthermore, a reaction norm can be a graphical representation of organismal variation in phenotype in response to numerous environmental circumstances. The graphical representation of reaction norms is commonly parabolic in shape, which represents the variation in plasticity across a population. Additionally, reaction norms allow organisms to evaluate the need for various phenotypes in response to the magnitude of the environmental signal.

=== Polyphenisms ===
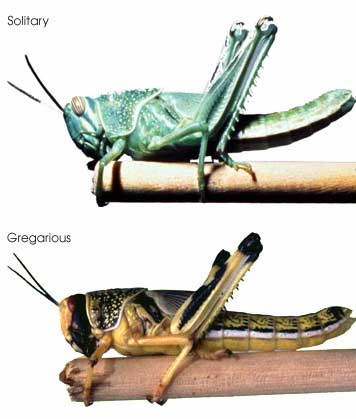
Example of phenotypic plasticity in the desert locust Schistocerca gregaria. The green pigment locust (top) has miniature wings that result from a low-density population. The deep pigmentation locust (bottom) has leg and wing development suitable for migration, which arose due to a high-density environment.

Polyphenism refers to the ability of a single genotype to produce a variety of phenotypes. In contrast to reaction norms, which produce a continuous range of phenotypes, polyphenisms allow a distinct phenotype to arise from altering environmental conditions. Polyphenisms occur in a wide range of organisms, including both vertebrates and invertebrates. A specific example of a polyphenism can be seen in the Florida carpenter ant, Camponotus floridanus. For a developing ant embryo, a multitude of environmental signals–such as the temperature surrounding the developing embryo, or the nutrition and chemicals provided to the larvae–can ultimately determine the adult ant's morphology and placement within the caste system. For Florida carpenter ants, the end phenotype and behavior are determined by the morphology; developing ants can become minor workers, major workers, or queen ants. An example of the anatomical differences seen in this species of ant is the presence or absence of wings and the size differences between male ants. Although the polyphenism of the ants has been documented, research is still needed to determine the molecular mechanisms for the induction of each unique phenotype. Another example of a polyphenism is temperature-dependent sex determination (TSD). This process occurs when variations in the external temperature surrounding eggs influence the development of reproductive organs within the embryo. TSD can be observed in crocodiles because they lack specialized sex chromosomes. Male crocodiles develop when temperatures stay neutral, between 31–32 °C (87.8–89.6 °F), whereas female crocodiles develop when the eggs experience a more extreme rise or fall in temperature. Polyphenism and its genomic pathways are not yet fully understood, and future research into the genetic aspects among various organisms could provide better insight into how different phenotypes arise.

=== Environmental cues ===
Environmental cues in either the maternal or the embryonic environment can result in changes in the embryo. Embryonic development is a sensitive process and can be impacted by cues from predators, light, and/or temperature. For example, in Daphnia, neonates exposed to predator cues displayed higher expression of genes related to digestion, reproductive function, and defense. It was hypothesized that this increase in gene expression would allow the Daphnia to defend themselves and that an increase in growth would result in a larger investment in future offspring. Subsequent generations exhibited a similar pattern, despite not being exposed to any predator cues, suggesting an inheritance of epigenetic expression factors. An organism's sensitivity to light during development could be useful in predicting what phenotype may be the most beneficial in the future based on the foliage of the mature organism.

==== Plants ====
In one study, the mechanisms of signaling certain triggers and responses in plants is studied. These networks function in providing the plants with a sort of cushion to environmental changes. Just like animals, plants know when or when not to produce flowers or fruit based on environmental changes.

A prime example of phenotypic plasticity in seeds is the size of the seed based on environmental conditions, as researched in Darwin's studies on Galapagos finches regarding beak size to seed size coevolution.

Since plants are immobile, they have to develop these systems of recognizing certain cues in order to provide a response that works in relation to their fitness and even more so their survival. Plants have a certain sensitivity about them, and this is exactly why it is needed. One study describes how canalization is the driving factor of the developing genetic plasticity in plants. It also discusses how the vernalization2 gene controls the epigenetic regulation of vernalization in one species known as Arabidopsis. As fluctuations in temperature and light can impact the health of the plant, the organism confers with its intricate network of a buffer to produce the best response in terms of survival and flourishment.

Peppered Moths

Since we are speaking of cues, the adult peppered moth's melanism is primarily a genetic adaptation driven by natural selection which is applied through environmental cues. The question is why?

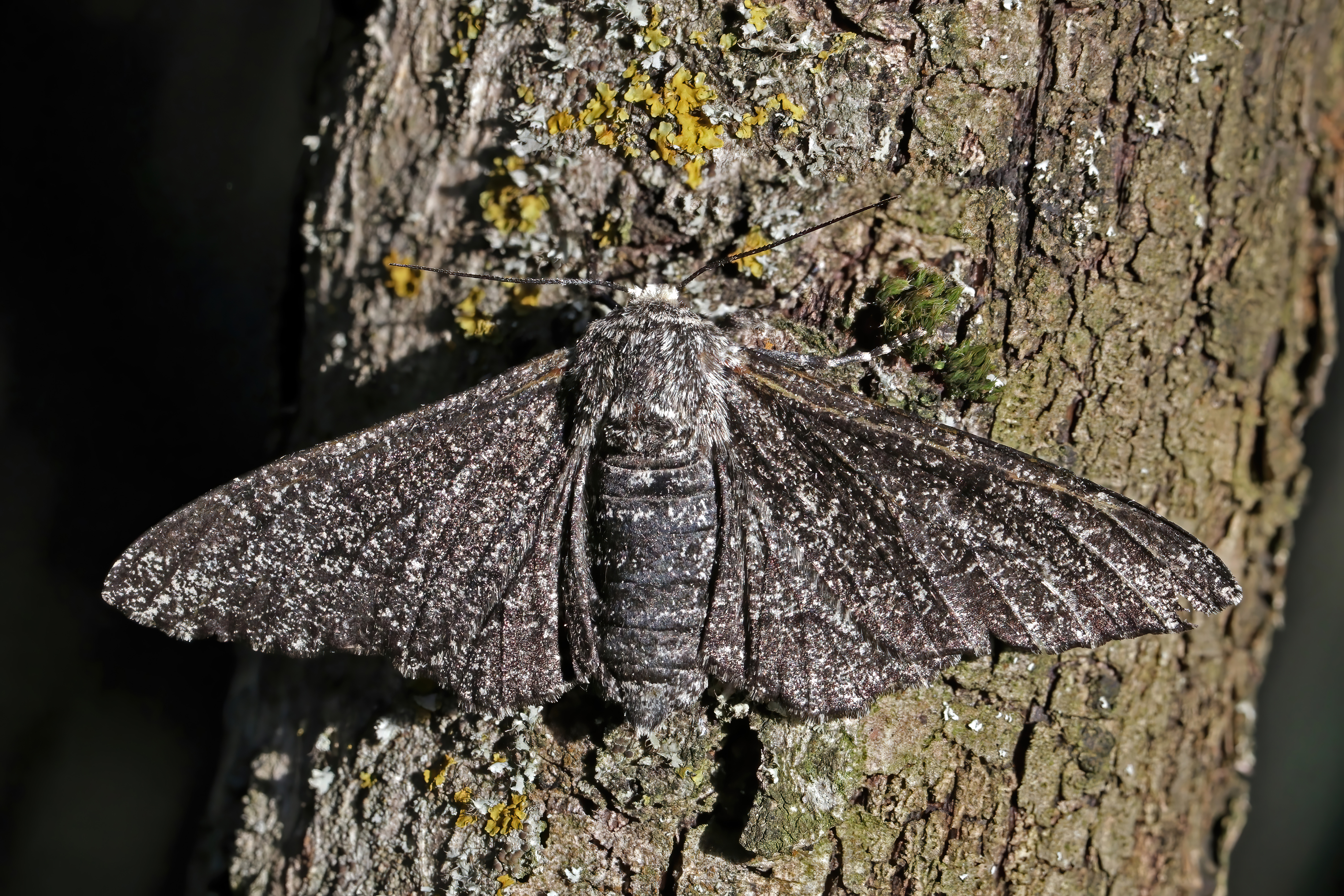
This is a picture of a melanistic female after the adaptive switch due to environmental pressures.

During the Industrial Revolution, air pollution caused a change in the moth population, with an increase in dark-colored moths due to industrial melanism. The caterpillars of the peppered moth have demonstrated the ability to change their coloration to match the color of the twigs they rest on. This is a prime example of phenotypic plasticity, where an organism's phenotype (observable characteristics) changes in response to environmental cues. The primary environmental cue that causes the larval color change, is visual information, gathered through the skin of the larvae. Studies have shown that even when blindfolded, the caterpillars can still sense and react to the color of their environment, indicating that they possess extraocular photoreception (light sensing through their skin). This shows that the light wavelengths that are being reflected off of the twigs, is the environmental cue causing the color change. This color plasticity is crucial for the larvae's survival.

==== Limb Morphology ====
Research has shown that Anolis lizard (anole) limb morphology can be influenced by the environment during development. Specifically, studies have demonstrated that the length of their hind limbs can vary depending on the substrate they experience as hatchlings. For example, Anolis lizards raised on broad surfaces tend to develop relatively longer hind limbs, while those raised on narrow surfaces develop relatively shorter hind limbs. This adaptation is thought to be related to their ability to move efficiently in their respective environments.

This is a great example of developmental plasticity, because the environment experienced during the early stages of life, effects the physical development of the animal.

Ecological relevance

Developmental plasticity seen here is ecologically relevant because it allows Anolis lizards to fine-tune their locomotor abilities to match their specific habitat. A benefit, yes, because it can enhance their survival and reproductive success. Moreover, this is especially important when considering the vast amount of different microhabitats that Anolis lizards occupy. Furthermore, research indicates that while plasticity is present, it does not fully explain all of the morphological differences observed in Anolis lizards. Evolutionary adaptation, through genetic changes, also plays a large role. In all, Anolis lizards demonstrate developmental plasticity, particularly through limb morphology, allowing them to adapt to different environmental conditions during their early development.

Temperature Sex Determination

Several species, including alligators and tortoises, have temperature-dependent sex determination, where the sex of the organism is dependent on the environmental temperature during a crucial thermosensitive period. An active area of research involves the mechanisms of temperature sex determination, which have been hypothesized to be associated with the methylation of specific genes.

== See also ==
- Hebbian theory
- Long-term potentiation
- Long-term depression
- NMDA receptor
- GABA receptor
- Cultured neuronal network
- Developmental plasticity in Drosophila melanogaster
