= Critical period hypothesis =

Hypothesis that younger people are better at language acquisition

The critical period hypothesis is a hypothesis within the field of linguistics and second language acquisition that claims a person can achieve native-like fluency in a language only before a certain age. It is the subject of a long-standing debate in linguistics and language acquisition over the extent to which the ability to acquire language is biologically linked to developmental stages of the brain. The critical period hypothesis was first proposed by Montreal neurologist Wilder Penfield and co-author Lamar Roberts in their 1959 book Speech and Brain Mechanisms, and was popularized by Eric Lenneberg in 1967 with Biological Foundations of Language.

The critical period hypothesis states that the first few years of life is the crucial time in which an individual can acquire a first language if presented with adequate stimuli, and that first-language acquisition relies on neuroplasticity of the brain. If language input does not occur until after this time, the individual will never achieve a full command of language. There is much debate over the timing of the critical period with respect to second-language acquisition (SLA), with estimates ranging between 2 and 13 years of age.

The critical period hypothesis is derived from the concept of a critical period in the biological sciences, which refers to a set period in which an organism must acquire a skill or ability, or said organism will not be able to acquire it later in life. Strictly speaking, the experimentally verified critical period relates to a time span during which damage to the development of the visual system can occur, for example if animals are deprived of the necessary binocular input for developing stereopsis.

Preliminary research into the critical period hypothesis investigated Lateralization of brain function as a possible neurological cause; however, this theoretical cause was largely discredited since lateralization does not necessarily increase with age, and no definitive link between language learning ability and lateralization was ever determined. A more general hypothesis holds that the critical period for language acquisition is linked to the interaction of the prolonged development of the human brain after birth and rearing in a socio-linguistic environment. Based on studies of the critical period for development of the visual system, this hypothesis holds that language-specific neural networks in the brain are constructed by the functional validation of synapses that are specifically activated by exposure to a linguistic environment early in life. Humans are uniquely capable of language due to the genetically determined size and complexity of the brain and the long period of postnatal development, during which the environment can select neuronal circuits that facilitate language.

Recently, it has been suggested that if a critical period does exist, it may be due at least partially to the delayed development of the prefrontal cortex in human children. Researchers have suggested that delayed development of the prefrontal cortex and an associated delay in the development of cognitive control may facilitate convention learning, allowing young children to learn language far more easily than cognitively mature adults and older children. This pattern of prefrontal development is unique to humans among similar mammalian (and primate) species, and may explain why humans—and not chimpanzees—are so adept at learning language.

== Linguistic competence ==
The discussion of a language acquisition critical period is complicated by the subjectivity of determining native-like competence in language, which includes things like pronunciation, prosody, syllable stress, timing and articulatory setting. Some aspects of language, such as phoneme tuning, grammar processing, articulation control, and vocabulary acquisition have weak critical periods and can be significantly improved by training at any age. Other aspects of language, such as prefrontal synthesis, have strong critical periods and cannot be acquired after the end of the critical period.

== Second-language acquisition ==
The theory has often been extended to a critical period for second-language acquisition (SLA). David Singleton states that in learning a second language, "younger = better in the long run", but points out that there are many exceptions, noting that five percent of adult bilinguals master a second language even though they begin learning it when they are well into adulthood—long after any critical period has presumably come to a close. Jane H. Hill posited that much research into SLA has focused on monolingual communities, whereas multilingual communities are more of a global norm, and this impacts the standard of competence that the SLA speaker is judged by.

While the window for learning a second language never completely closes, certain linguistic aspects appear to be more affected by the age of the learner than others. For example, adult second-language learners nearly always retain an immediately identifiable foreign accent, including some who display perfect grammar. A possible explanation for why this foreign accent remains is that pronunciation, or phonology, is susceptible to the critical period. The pronunciation of speech sounds relies on neuromuscular function. Adults learning a new language are unlikely to attain a convincing native accent since they are past the prime age of learning new neuromuscular functions, and therefore pronunciations. Writers have suggested a younger critical age for learning phonology than for morphemes and syntax. Singleton & Lengyel (1995) reports that there is no critical period for learning vocabulary in a second language because vocabulary is learned consciously using declarative memory. The attrition of procedural memory with age results in the increased use of declarative memory to learn new languages, which is an entirely different process from L1 (first language) learning. The plasticity of procedural memory is argued to decline after the age of 5. The attrition of procedural memory plasticity inhibits the ability of an L2 user to speak their second language automatically. It can still take conscious effort even if they are exposed to the second language as early as age 3. This effort is observed by measuring brain activity. L2-users that are exposed to their second language at an early age and are everyday users show lower levels of brain activity when using their L1 than when using their L2. This suggests that additional resources are recruited when speaking their L2 and it is therefore a more strenuous process.

The critical period hypothesis in SLA follows a "use it then lose it" approach, which dictates that as a person ages, excess neural circuitry used during L1 learning is essentially broken down. If these neural structures remained intact they would cost unnecessary metabolic energy to maintain. The structures necessary for L1 use are kept. On the other hand, a second "use it or lose it" approach dictates that if an L2 user begins to learn at an early age and continues on through their life, then their language-learning circuitry should remain active. This approach is also called the "exercise hypothesis".

There is much debate over the timing of the critical period with respect to SLA, with estimates ranging between 2 and 13 years of age. However, some studies have shown that "even very young L2 beginners diverge at the level of fine linguistic detail from native speakers."

Some writers have argued that the critical period hypothesis does not apply to SLA, and that second-language proficiency is determined by the time and effort put into the learning process, and not the learner's age. Robertson (2002) observed that factors other than age may be even more significant in successful second-language learning, such as personal motivation, anxiety, input and output skills, and the learning environment. A combination of these factors often leads to individual variation in second-language acquisition outcomes.

On reviewing the published material, Bialystok and Hakuta (1994) conclude that second-language learning is not necessarily subject to biological critical periods, but "on average, there is a continuous decline in ability [to learn] with age."

== Experimental and observational studies ==
How children acquire native language (L1) and the relevance of this to foreign language (L2) learning has long been debated. Although evidence for L2 learning ability declining with age is controversial, a common notion is that children learn L2s easily, whilst older learners rarely achieve fluency. This assumption stems from 'critical period' (CP) ideas. A CP was popularised by Eric Lenneberg in 1967 for L1 acquisition, but considerable interest now surrounds age effects on second-language acquisition (SLA). SLA theories explain learning processes and suggest causal factors for a possible CP for second language acquisition. These SLA-CP theories mainly attempt to explain apparent differences in language aptitudes of children and adults by distinct learning routes, and clarify these differences by discussing psychological mechanisms. Research explores these ideas and hypotheses, but results are varied: some demonstrate pre-pubescent children acquire language easily, and some that older learners have the advantage, whilst others focus on existence of a CP for SLA. Recent studies (e.g. Mayberry and Lock, 2003) have recognised certain aspects of SLA may be affected by age, whilst others remain intact. The objective of this study is to investigate whether capacity for vocabulary acquisition decreases with age.

Other work has challenged the biological approach; Krashen (1975) re-analysed clinical data used as evidence and concluded cerebral specialisation occurs much earlier than Lenneberg calculated. Therefore, if a CP exists, it does not coincide with lateralisation. Despite concerns with Lenneberg's original evidence and the dissociation of lateralisation from the language CP idea, however, the concept of a CP remains a viable hypothesis, which later work has better explained and substantiated.

A 2013 study at the University of Fribourg in Switzerland found that age and the success of second language acquisition is not linear. Jan Vanhove discusses some of the flaws within the use of critical period hypothesis, one of them being how the actual age in which the critical period hypothesis is cut off is variable depending on who is providing a definition or conducting research. Some research studies have considered the critical period to be any point before puberty, whereas, other studies have considered the cut off point to be at twelve months old. According to Vanhove, not all research related to the critical period hypothesis is reliable and has been influenced by confirmation bias. Vanhove is one of several researchers within the field of second language acquisition who has suggested that the critical period hypothesis may not always predict the success of second language acquisition.

=== Age and developmental periods ===
A review of SLA theories and their explanations for age-related differences is necessary before considering empirical studies. The most reductionist theories are those of Penfield and Roberts (1959) and Lenneberg (1967), which stem from L1 and brain damage studies. Children who suffer impairment before puberty typically recover and (re-)develop normal language, whereas adults rarely recover fully, and often do not regain verbal abilities beyond the point reached five months after impairment. Both theories agree that children have a neurological advantage in learning languages, and that puberty correlates with a turning point in ability. They assert that language acquisition occurs primarily, possibly exclusively, during childhood as the brain loses plasticity after a certain age. It then becomes rigid and fixed, and loses the ability for adaptation and reorganisation, rendering language (re-)learning difficult. Penfield and Roberts (1959) claim children under nine can learn up to three languages: early exposure to different languages activates a reflex in the brain allowing them to switch between languages without confusion or translation into L1 (Penfield, 1964). Lenneberg (1967) asserts that if no language is learned by puberty, it cannot be learned in a normal, functional sense. He also supports Penfield and Roberts' (1959) proposal of neurological mechanisms responsible for maturational change in language learning abilities. This, Lenneberg maintains, coincides with brain lateralisation and left-hemispherical specialisation for language around age thirteen: infants' motor and linguistic skills develop simultaneously, but by age thirteen the cerebral hemispheres' functions separate and become set, making language acquisition extremely difficult (Lenneberg, 1967).

=== Deaf and feral children ===
Cases of deaf and feral children provide evidence for a biologically determined CP for L1. Feral children are those not exposed to language in infancy/childhood due to being brought up in the wild, in isolation and/or confinement. A classic example is 'Genie', a victim of child abuse who was deprived of social interaction from birth until discovered aged thirteen. Her father had judged her "retarded" at birth and had chosen to isolate her. She was kept strapped to a potty chair and forced to wear diapers. She was completely without language. Her case presented an ideal opportunity to test the theory that a nurturing environment could somehow make up for the total lack of language past the age of 12. After seven years of rehabilitation Genie still lacked linguistic competence, although the degree to which she acquired language is disputed. Another case is 'Isabelle', who was incarcerated with her deaf-mute mother until the age of six and a half (pre-pubescent). She also had no language skills, but, unlike Genie, quickly acquired normal language abilities through systematic specialist training. Detractors of the critical period hypothesis point out that in these examples and others like them (see feral children), the child is hardly growing up in a nurturing environment, and that the lack of language acquisition in later life may be due to the results of a generally abusive environment rather than being specifically due to a lack of exposure to language. Such studies are problematic; isolation can result in general intellectual and emotional disturbances, which may confound conclusions drawn about language abilities.

Studies of deaf children learning American Sign Language (ASL) have fewer methodological weaknesses. Newport and Supalla studied ASL acquisition in deaf children differing in age of exposure; few were exposed to ASL from birth, most of them first learned it at school. Results showed a linear decline in performance with increasing age of exposure; those exposed to ASL from birth performed best, and 'late learners' worst, on all production and comprehension tests. Their study thus provides direct evidence for language learning ability decreasing with age, but it does not add to Lenneberg's CP hypothesis as even the oldest children, the 'late learners', were exposed to ASL by age four, and had therefore not reached puberty, the proposed end of the CP. In addition, the declines were shown to be linear, with no sudden 'drop off' of ability at a certain age, as would be predicted by a strong CP hypothesis. That the children performed significantly worse may suggest that the CP ends earlier than originally postulated. However, this decline in performance may also be attributed in part to limitations of second language acquisition for hearing parents learning ASL.

=== Behavioural approaches ===
Contrary to biological views, behavioural approaches assert that languages are learned as any other behaviour, through conditioning. Skinner (1957) details how operant conditioning forms connections with the environment through interaction and, alongside O. Hobart Mowrer (1960), applies the ideas to language acquisition. Mowrer hypothesises that languages are acquired through rewarded imitation of 'language models'; the model must have an emotional link to the learner (e.g. parent, spouse), as imitation then brings pleasant feelings which function as positive reinforcement. Because new connections between behaviour and the environment are formed and reformed throughout life, it is possible to gain new skills, including language(s), at any age.

To explain observed language learning differences between children and adults, children are postulated to create countless new connections daily, and may handle the language learning process more effectively than do adults. This assumption, however, remains untested and is not a reliable explanation for children's aptitude for L2 learning. Problematic of the behaviourist approach is its assumption that all learning, verbal and non-verbal, occurs through the same processes. A more general problem is that, as Pinker (1995) notes, almost every sentence anybody voices is an original combination of words, never previously uttered, therefore a language cannot consist only of word combinations learned through repetition and conditioning; the brain must contain innate means of creating endless amounts of grammatical sentences from a limited vocabulary. This is precisely what Chomsky (1965) (reprinted as Chomsky (1969)) argues with his proposition of a universal grammar (UG).

=== Universal grammar ===
Chomsky (1969) asserts that environmental factors must be relatively unimportant for language emergence, as so many different factors surround children acquiring L1. Instead, Chomsky claims language learners possess innate principles building a 'language acquisition device' (LAD) in the brain. These principles denote restricted possibilities for variation within the language, and enable learners to construct a grammar out of 'raw input' collected from the environment. Input alone cannot explain language acquisition because it is degenerated by characteristic features such as stutters, and lacks corrections from which learners discover incorrect variations.

Singleton and Newport (2004) demonstrate the function of UG in their study of 'Simon'. Simon learned ASL as his L1 from parents who had learned it as an L2 after puberty and provided him with imperfect models. Results showed Simon learned normal and logical rules and was able to construct an organised linguistic system, despite being exposed to inconsistent input. Chomsky developed UG to explain L1 acquisition data, but maintains it also applies to L2 learners who achieve near-native fluency not attributable solely to input and interaction (Chomsky 1969).

Although it does not describe an optimal age for SLA, the theory implies that younger children can learn languages more easily than older learners, as adults must reactivate principles developed during L1 learning and forge an SLA path: children can learn several languages simultaneously as long as the principles are still active and they are exposed to sufficient language samples (Pinker, 1995). The parents of Singleton and Newport's (2004) patient also had linguistic abilities in line with these age-related predictions; they learned ASL after puberty and never reached complete fluency.

==== Problems within UG theory for L2 acquisition ====
There are, however, problems with the extrapolation of the UG theory to SLA: L2 learners go through several phases of types of utterance that are not similar to their L1 or the L2 they hear. Other factors include the cognitive maturity of most L2 learners, that they have different motivation for learning the language, and already speak one language fluently. Other studies also highlight these problems: Stanislas Dehaene has investigated how cerebral circuits used to handling one language adapt for the efficient storage of two or more. He reports observations of cerebral activation when reading and translating two languages. They found the most activated brain areas during the tasks were not those generally associated with language, but rather those related to mapping orthography to phonology. They conclude that the left temporal lobe is the physical base of L1, but the L2 is 'stored' elsewhere, thus explaining cases of bilingual aphasia where one language remains intact. They maintain that only languages learned simultaneously from birth are represented, and cause activity, in the left hemisphere: any L2 learned later is stored separately (possibly in the right hemisphere), and rarely activates the left temporal lobe.

This suggests that L2 may be qualitatively different from L1 due to its dissociation from the 'normal' language brain regions, thus the extrapolation of L1 studies and theories to SLA is placed in question. A further disadvantage of UG is that supporting empirical data are taken from a limited sample of syntactic phenomena: a general theory of language acquisition should cover a larger range of phenomena. Despite these problems, several other theorists have based their own models of language learning on it. These ideas are supported by empirical evidence, which consequently supports Chomsky's ideas. Due to this support and its descriptive and explanatory strength, many theorists regard UG as the best explanation of language, and particularly grammar, acquisition.

==== UG and the critical period hypothesis ====
A key question about the relationship of UG and SLA is: is the language acquisition device posited by Chomsky and his followers still accessible to learners of a second language? The critical period hypothesis suggests that it becomes inaccessible at a certain age, and learners increasingly depend on explicit teaching. In other words, although all of language may be governed by UG, older learners might have great difficulty in gaining access to the target language's underlying rules from positive input alone.

=== Piaget ===
Piaget (1926) is one psychologist reluctant to ascribe specific innate linguistic abilities to children: he considers the brain a homogeneous computational system, with language acquisition being one part of general learning. He agrees this development may be innate, but claims there is no specific language acquisition module in the brain. Instead, he suggests external influences and social interaction trigger language acquisition: information collected from these sources constructs symbolic and functional schemata (thought or behaviour patterns). According to Piaget, cognitive development and language acquisition are lifelong active processes that constantly update and re-organise schemata. He proposes children develop L1 as they build a sense of identity in reference to the environment, and describes phases of general cognitive development, with processes and patterns changing systematically with age. Piaget assumes language acquisition is part of this complex cognitive development, and that these developmental phases are the basis for an optimal period for language acquisition in childhood. Interactionist approaches derived from Piaget's ideas supports his theory. Some studies (e.g. Newport and Supalla) show that, rather than abrupt changes in SLA ability after puberty, language ability declines with age, coinciding with declines in other cognitive abilities, thus supporting Piaget.

=== Krashen ===
Stephen Krashen's work contradicts the critical period hypothesis. Krashen claims that adult learners have advantages over children in some aspects of second language acquisition. His research indicates that adults are able to pick up grammar rules, including word order and word parts, at a quicker rate than children. Krashen has also argued that older children can learn grammar at a faster rate than younger children. These ideas contradict critical period hypothesis as they suggest that older learners have some advantages over younger learners when they are acquiring a second language.

Krashen (1975) also criticises Piaget's theory, but he does not deny the importance of age for second-language acquisition. Krashen (1975) proposed theories for the close of the CP for L2 at puberty, based on Piaget's cognitive stage of formal operations beginning at puberty, as the 'ability of the formal operational thinker to construct abstract hypotheses to explain phenomena' inhibits the individual's natural ability for language learning.

The term "language acquisition" became commonly used after Stephen Krashen contrasted it with formal and non-constructive "learning." Today, most scholars use "language learning" and "language acquisition" interchangeably, unless they are directly addressing Krashen's work. However, "second-language acquisition" or "SLA" has become established as the preferred term for this academic discipline.

Though SLA is often viewed as part of applied linguistics, it is typically concerned with the language system and learning processes themselves, whereas applied linguistics may focus more on the experiences of the learner, particularly in the classroom. Additionally, SLA has mostly examined naturalistic acquisition, where learners acquire a language with little formal training or teaching.

=== Other directions of research ===
==== Effect of illiteracy ====
Virtually all research findings on SLA to date build on data from literate learners. Tarone, Bigelow & Hansen (2009) find significantly different results when replicating standard SLA studies with low literate L2 learners. Specifically, learners with lower alphabetic literacy levels are significantly less likely to notice corrective feedback on form or to perform elicited imitation tasks accurately. These findings are consistent with research in cognitive psychology showing significant differences in phonological awareness between literate and illiterate adults. An important direction for SLA research must therefore involve the exploration of the impact of alphabetic literacy on cognitive processing in second-language acquisition.

Empirical research has attempted to account for variables detailed by SLA theories and provide an insight into L2 learning processes, which can be applied in educational environments. Recent SLA investigations have followed two main directions: one focuses on pairings of L1 and L2 that render L2 acquisition particularly difficult, and the other investigates certain aspects of language that may be maturationally constrained. Flege, Mackay & Piske (2002) looked at bilingual dominance to evaluate two explanations of L2 performance differences between bilinguals and monolingual-L2 speakers, i.e. a maturationally defined CP or interlingual interference.

==== Bilingual dominance ====
Flege, Mackay & Piske (2002) investigated whether the age at which participants learned English affected dominance in Italian-English bilinguals, and found the early bilinguals were English (L2) dominant and the late bilinguals Italian (L1) dominant. Further analysis showed that dominant Italian bilinguals had detectable foreign accents when speaking English, but early bilinguals (English dominant) had no accents in either language. This suggests that, though interlingual interference effects are not inevitable, their emergence, and bilingual dominance, may be related to a CP.

Sebastián-Gallés, Echeverría & Bosch (2005) also studied bilinguals and highlight the importance of early language exposure. They looked at vocabulary processing and representation in Spanish-Catalan bilinguals exposed to both languages simultaneously from birth in comparison to those who had learned L2 later and were either Spanish- or Catalan-dominant. Findings showed 'from birth bilinguals' had significantly more difficulty distinguishing Catalan words from non-words differing in specific vowels than Catalan-dominants did (measured by reaction time).

These difficulties are attributed to a phase around age eight months where bilingual infants are insensitive to vowel contrasts, despite the language they hear most. This affects how words are later represented in their lexicons, highlighting this as a decisive period in language acquisition and showing that initial language exposure shapes linguistic processing for life. Sebastián-Gallés, Echeverría & Bosch (2005) also indicate the significance of phonology for L2 learning; they believe learning an L2 once the L1 phonology is already internalised can reduce individuals' abilities to distinguish new sounds that appear in the L2.

Additionally, however, there have also been a couple of studies done by Bongaerts, Mennen and Slik (2002) and Stefanik (2001) investigating the validity of critical period position that found L2 learners to demonstrate native-like accents when reading aloud exercises in their non-native language despite participants being older than the proposed critical period cutoff. Thus, these findings have contributed to the debate on critical period hypothesis and bilingual dominance.

==== Age effects on grammar learning ====
Most studies into age effects on specific aspects of SLA have focused on grammar, with the common conclusion that it is highly constrained by age, more so than semantic functioning. Harley (1986) compared attainment of French learners in early and late immersion programs. She reports that after 1000 exposure hours, late learners had better control of French verb systems and syntax. However, comparing early immersion students (average age 6.917 years) with age-matched native speakers identified common problem areas, including third person plurals and polite 'vous' forms. This suggests grammar (in L1 or L2) is generally acquired later, possibly because it requires abstract cognition and reasoning.

B. Harley also measured eventual attainment and found the two age groups made similar mistakes in syntax and lexical selection, often confusing French with the L1. The general conclusion from these investigations is that different aged learners acquire the various aspects of language with varying difficulty. Some variation in grammatical performance is attributed to maturation, however, all participants began immersion programs before puberty and so were too young for a strong critical period hypothesis to be directly tested.

This corresponds to Noam Chomsky's UG theory, which states that while language acquisition principles are still active, it is easy to learn a language, and the principles developed through L1 acquisition are vital for learning an L2.

Scherag et al. (2004) also suggest learning some syntactic processing functions and lexical access may be limited by maturation, whereas semantic functions are relatively unaffected by age. They studied the effect of late SLA on speech comprehension by German immigrants to the US and American immigrants to Germany. They found that native-English speakers who learned German as adults were disadvantaged on certain grammatical tasks but performed at near-native levels on lexical tasks.

==== Semantic functions acquisition ====
One study that specifically mentions semantic functions acquisition is that of Weber-Fox & Neville (1996). Their results showed that Chinese-English bilinguals who had been exposed to English after puberty, learned vocabulary to a higher competence level than syntactic aspects of language. They do, however, report that the judgment accuracies in detecting semantic anomalies were altered in subjects who were exposed to English after sixteen years of age, but were affected to a lesser degree than were grammatical aspects of language. It has been speculated by Neville & Bavelier (2001) and Scherag et al. (2004) that semantic aspects of language are founded on associative learning mechanisms, which allow lifelong learning, whereas syntactical aspects are based on computational mechanisms, which can only be constructed during certain age periods. Consequently, it is reasoned, semantic functions are easier to access during comprehension of an L2 and therefore dominate the process: if these are ambiguous, understanding of syntactic information is not facilitated. These suppositions would help explain the results of Scherag et al.'s (2004) study.

==== Advantages of bilingual education for children ====
It is commonly believed that children are better suited to learning a second language than are adults. However, general second-language research has failed to support the critical period hypothesis in its strong form (i.e., the claim that full language acquisition is impossible beyond a certain age). According to Linda M. Espinosa, especially in the United States the number of children growing up with a home language that is not English but Spanish is constantly increasing. Therefore, these children have to learn the English language before kindergarten as a second language. This fact leads to the question whether having the ability to speak two languages helps or harms young children. Research shows that the acquisition of a second language in early childhood confers several advantages, especially a greater awareness of linguistic structures. Furthermore, it is advantageous for young children to grow up bilingually because they do not need to be taught systematically but learn languages intuitively. How fast a child can learn a language depends on several personal factors, such as interest and motivation, and their learning environment. Communication should be facilitated rather than forcing a child to learn a language with strict rules. Education in early childhood can lead to an effective educational achievement for children from various cultural environments.

Another aspect worth considering is that bilingual children are often doing code switching, which does not mean that the child is not able to separate the languages. The reason for code switching is the child's lack of vocabulary in a certain situation. The acquisition of a second language in early childhood broadens children's minds and enriches them more than it harms them. Thus they are not only able to speak two languages in spite of being very young but they also acquire knowledge about the different cultures and environments. It is possible for one language to dominate. This depends on how much time is spent on learning each language.

== Evolutionary explanations ==
=== Hurford's model ===
In order to provide evidence for the evolutionary functionality of the critical period in language acquisition, Hurford (1991) generated a computer simulation of plausible conditions of evolving generations, based on three central assumptions:

1. Language is an evolutionary adaptation that is naturally selected for.
2. Any given individual's language can be quantified or measured.
3. Various aspects of maturation and development are under genetic control, which determines the timing for critical periods for certain capacities (i.e. polygenic inheritance).

According to Hurford's evolutionary model, language acquisition is an adaptation that has survival value for humans, and that knowing a language correlates positively with an individual's reproductive advantage. This finding is in line with views of other researchers such as Chomsky and Pinker & Bloom (1990). For example, Steven Pinker and Paul Bloom argue that because a language is a complex design that serves a specific function that cannot be replaced by any other existing capacity, the trait of language acquisition can be attributed to natural selection.

However, while arguing that language itself is adaptive and "did not 'just happen'", Hurford suggests that the critical period is not an adaptation, but rather a constraint on language that emerged due to a lack of selection pressures that reinforce acquiring more than one language. In other words, Hurford explains the existence of a critical period with genetic drift, the idea that when there are no selection pressures on multiple alleles acting on the same trait, one of the alleles will gradually diminish through evolution. Because the simulation reveals no evolutionary advantage of acquiring more than one language, Hurford suggests that the critical period evolved simply as a result of a lack of selection pressure.

=== Komarova and Nowak's dynamical system ===
Komarova and Nowak (2001) supported Hurford's model, yet pointed out that it was limited in the sense that it did not take into account the costs of learning a language. Therefore, they created their own algorithmic model, with the following assumptions:

1. Language ability correlates with an individual's reproductive fitness
2. The ability to learn language is inherited
3. There are costs to learning a language

Their model consists of a population with constant size, where language ability is a predictor of reproductive fitness. The learning mechanism in their model is based on linguistic theories of Chomsky (1980, 1993)—the language acquisition device (LAD) and the notion of universal grammar. The results of their model show that the critical period for language acquisition is an "evolutionarily stable strategy (ESS)" (Komarova & Nowak, 2001, p. 1190). They suggest that this ESS is due to two competing selection pressures. First, if the period for learning is short, language does not develop as well, and thus decreases the evolutionary fitness of the individual. Alternatively, if the period for learning language is long, it becomes too costly to the extent that it reduces reproductive opportunity for the individual, and therefore limits reproductive fitness. Therefore, the critical period is an adaptive mechanism that keeps these pressures at equilibrium, and aims at optimal reproductive success for the individual.

== See also ==
- Child development
- Child-directed speech
- Individual variation in second-language acquisition
- Language deprivation experiments
- Multi-competence
- Multilingualism
- The Myth of the First Three Years
