= Malleability of intelligence =

Processes by which intelligence can change over time

Malleability of intelligence describes the processes by which intelligence can increase or decrease over time and is not static. These changes may come as a result of genetics, pharmacological factors, psychological factors, behavior, or environmental conditions. Malleable intelligence may refer to changes in cognitive skills, memory, reasoning, or muscle memory related motor skills. In general, the majority of changes in human intelligence occur at either the onset of development, during the critical period, or during old age (see neuroplasticity).

Charles Spearman, who coined the general intelligence factor "g", described intelligence as one's ability to adapt to his environment with a set of useful skills including reasoning and understanding patterns and relationships. He believed individuals highly developed in one intellectual ability tended to be highly developed at other intellectual abilities. A more intelligent individual was thought to be able to more easily "accommodate" experiences into existing cognitive structures to develop structures more compatible with environmental stimuli.

In general, intelligence is thought to be attributed to both genetic and environmental factors, but the extent to which each plays a key role is highly disputed. Studies of identical and non-identical twins raised separately and together show a strong correlation between child IQ and socio-economic level of the parents. Children raised in lower-class families tend to score lower on intelligence tests when compared to children raised in both middle and upper-class families. However, there is no difference in intelligence scores between children raised in middle versus upper-class families.

== Definitions ==
- Intelligence: a very general capability that, among other things, involves the ability to reason, plan, solve problems, think abstractly, comprehend complex ideas, learn quickly and learn from experience.
- Critical period: a restricted developmental period during which the nervous system is particularly sensitive to the effects of experience.

== Neuroscience basis ==
The biological basis of intelligence is founded in the degree of connectivity of neurons in the brain and the varying amounts of white and grey matter. Studies show that intelligence is positively correlated with total cerebral volume. While it is true that the number of neurons in the brain actually decreases throughout development, as neural connections grow and the pathways become more efficient, the supporting structures in the brain increase. This increase in supporting tissues, which include myelination, blood vessels, and glial cells, leads to an increase in overall brain size. When brain circumference and IQ were compared in 9 year olds, a positive correlation was found between the two. An increase of 2.87 IQ points occurred for each standard deviation increase in brain circumference.

=== Importance of critical period ===
The brain grows rapidly for the first five years of human development. At age five, the human brain is 90% of its total size. Then the brain finishes growing gradually until mid to late twenties. From start to finish, the brain increases in size by over 300% from birth. The critical period, defined as the beginning years of brain development, is essential to intellectual development, as the brain optimizes the overproduction of synapses present at birth. During the critical period, the neuronal pathways are refined based on which synapses are active and receiving transmission. It is a "use it or lose it" phenomenon.

=== Neural plasticity ===
Neural plasticity refers to any change in the structure of the neural network that forms the central nervous system. Neural plasticity is the neuronal basis for changes in how the mind works, including learning, the formation of memory, and changes in intelligence. One well-studied form of plasticity is Long-Term Potentiation (LTP). It refers to a change in neural connectivity as a result of high activation on both sides of a synaptic cleft. This change in neural connectivity allows information to be more easily processed, as the neural connection associated with that information becomes stronger through LTP. Other forms of plasticity involve the growth of new neurons, the growth of new connections between neurons, and the selective elimination of such connection, called "dendritic pruning".

=== Genetic factors of intelligence ===
Humans have varying degrees of neuroplasticity due to their genetic makeups, which affects their ability to adapt to conditions in their environments and effectively learn from experiences. The degree to which intelligence test scores can be linked to genetic heritability increases with age. There is presently no explanation for this puzzling result, but flaws in the testing methods are suspected. A study of Dutch twins concludes that intelligence of 5 year olds is 26% heritable, while the test scores of 12-year-olds is 64% heritable. Structurally, genetic influences explain 77–88% of the variance in the thickness of the mid-sagittal area of the corpus callosum, the volume of the caudate nucleus, and the volumes of the parietal and temporal lobes.

== Pharmacological influence ==
Numerous pharmacological developments have been made to help organize neural circuitry for patients with learning disorders. The cholinergic and glutamatergic systems in the brain serve an important role in learning, memory, and the developmental organization of neuronal circuitry. These systems help to capitalize on the critical period and organize synaptic transmission. Autism and other learning disabilities have been targeted with drugs focusing on cholinergic and glutamatergic transmission. These drugs increase the amount of acetylcholine present in the brain by increasing the production of acetylcholine precursors, as well as inhibiting acetylcholine degradation by cholinesterases. By focusing on heightening the activity of this system, the brain's responsiveness to activity-dependent plasticity is improved. Specifically, glutamatergic drugs may reduce the threshold for LTP, promote more normal dendritic spine morphology, and retain a greater number of useful synaptic connections. Cholinergic drugs may reconnect the basal forebrain with the cortex and hippocampus, connections that are often disrupted in patients with learning disorders.

== Psychological factors ==
Psychological factors and preconceived notions about intelligence can be as influential on intelligence as genetic makeup. Children with early chronic stress show impaired corticolimbic connectivity in development. Early chronic stress is defined as inconsistent or inadequate care-giving and disruption to early rearing environment. These children showed decreased cognitive function, especially in fluid cognition, or the ability to effectively utilize working memory. The lack of connectivity between the limbic system and the prefrontal cortex can be blamed for this deficiency.

== Behavioral factors ==
In the study of malleable intelligence, behavioral factors are often the most intriguing because these are factors humans can seek to control. There are numerous behavioral factors that affect intellectual development and neural plasticity. The key is plasticity, which is caused by experience-driven electrical activation of neurons. This experience-driven activation causes axons to sprout new branches and develop new presynaptic terminals. These new branches often lead to greater mental processing in different areas.

=== Taking advantage of the critical period ===
As previously discussed, the critical period is a time of neural pruning and great intellectual development.

== See also ==
- Cognitive development – Field of study in neuroscience and psychology
- Intelligence – Ability to perceive, infer, retain or apply information
- Intelligence quotient – Score from a test designed to assess intelligence
- Neuroplasticity – Ability of the brain to continuously change
- Improving fluid intelligence – Factors of general intelligence
