= Rachel Mayberry =

Language scientist

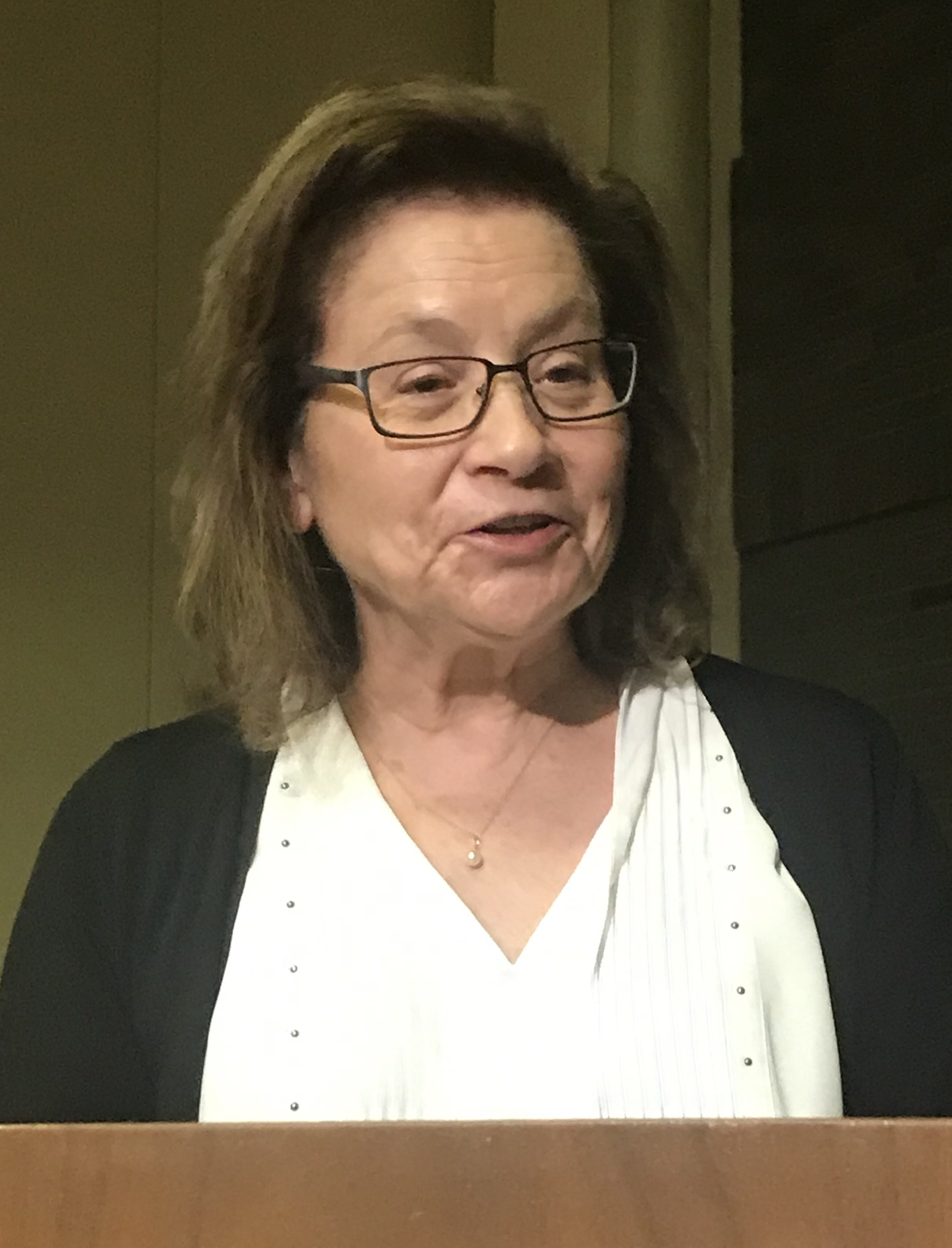
- Mayberry at the Boston University Conference on Language Development, 2019

Academic background
- Education: Drake University (BA); Washington University in St. Louis (MS); McGill University (PhD)

Academic work
- Discipline: Communication scientist
- Sub-discipline: Language acquisition
- Institutions: McGill University; University of California, San Diego
- Main interests: Sign language acquisition

Rachel I. Mayberry is a language scientist known for her research on the effects of age of acquisition on sign language acquisition among deaf individuals – research that has provided evidence for a critical period in first language acquisition. She is Professor of Linguistics at University of California, San Diego (UCSD) and director of the Multimodal Language Lab.

Mayberry received the Research Leadership Award from the McGill University School of Communication Sciences and Disorders in 2019 for "her distinguished career as a leader in research and research training in communication sciences and disorders."

Mayberry co-edited the book Language Acquisition by Eye (with Charlene Chamberlain and Jill Morford).

== Biography ==
Mayberry received her B.A. degree in English at Drake University and her Masters of Science in Speech and Hearing Science at Washington University in St. Louis in 1973. She attended graduate school at McGill University where she obtained her Ph.D. in 1979 in Communication Sciences & Disorders. Her dissertation was titled Facial Expression and Redundancy in American Sign Language.

Mayberry held faculty and research positions at Northwestern University and at the University of Chicago before joining the faculty of the McGill School of Communication Sciences and Disorders in 1989. She served as Director of McGill School of Communication Sciences and Disorders from 1997–2002 before moving to the UCSD in 2005.

Over the years, Mayberry has secured multiple research grants from various agencies including the National Science Foundation, the National Institutes of Health, and the Kavli Foundation. These awards have supported her work establishing a critical period for first-language acquisition among deaf individuals learning American Sign Language at varying ages, and her work on the initial period of sign language acquisition among deaf individuals who use home sign, a system of language-like gestures used by deaf individuals who lack access to an established sign language.

== Research ==
Mayberry's research program has focused on effects of varying age of exposure to language among deaf individuals, with a focus on the acquisition of American Sign Language as a first language by individuals of different ages. She has studied how age of acquisition affects sign language development by comparing native signers (deaf individuals who grew up learning sign language) with late signers (deaf people who acquired sign language after early childhood). She found that deaf individuals who did not acquire sign language at a young age had difficulties acquiring its grammatical and morphological features and showed differences in sign language processing as compared to native signers. Late signers also performed worse than native signers in learning English as a second language.

Mayberry's lab has used functional magnetic resonance imaging (fMRI) and magnetoencephalography (MEG) to study how age of acquisition affects the functional organization of language in the brain. In 2018, her research group received the Best Poster Presentation Award from the open-access journal languages for their work on "The neural basis of syntactic processing in American Sign Language: An fMRI study."

== Representative publications ==
- Mayberry, R. I. (1993). First-language acquisition after childhood differs from second-language acquisition: The case of American Sign Language. Journal of Speech, Language, and Hearing Research, 36(6), 1258–1270.
- Mayberry, R. I., & Eichen, E. B. (1991). The long-lasting advantage of learning sign language in childhood: Another look at the critical period for language acquisition. Journal of Memory and Language, 30(4), 486–512.
- Mayberry, R. I., & Kluender, R. (2018). Rethinking the critical period for language: New insights into an old question from American Sign Language. Bilingualism: Language and Cognition, 21(5), 886–905.
- Mayberry, R. I., & Lock, E. (2003). Age constraints on first versus second language acquisition: Evidence for linguistic plasticity and epigenesis. Brain and language, 87(3), 369–384.
- Mayberry, R. I., Lock, E., & Kazmi, H. (2002). Development: Linguistic ability and early language exposure. Nature, 417(6884), 38.
