= Critical period =

Maturational stage in the lifespan of an organism

In imprinting and developmental biology, a critical period is a maturational stage in the lifespan of an organism during which the nervous system is especially sensitive to certain environmental stimuli. If, for some reason, the organism does not receive the appropriate stimulus during this "critical period" to learn a given skill or trait, it may be difficult, ultimately less successful, or even impossible, to develop certain associated functions later in life. Functions that are indispensable to an organism's survival, such as vision, are particularly likely to develop during critical periods. "Critical period" also relates to the ability to acquire one's first language. Researchers found that people who passed the "critical period" without having developed communication skills would not acquire their first language fluently.

Some researchers differentiate between 'strong critical periods' and 'weak critical periods' (also known as 'sensitive' periods)—defining 'weak critical periods' / 'sensitive periods' as more extended periods, after which learning is still possible. Other researchers consider these the same phenomenon.

For example, the critical period for the development of a human child's binocular vision is thought to be between three and eight months, with sensitivity to damage extending up to at least three years of age. Further critical periods have been identified for the development of hearing and the vestibular system. The critical period of sensitivity cannot be predicted from the period of development. Furthermore, recent work relating to visual deprivation and recovery suggests that some recovery can occur outside both these periods.

== Strong versus weak critical periods ==
Examples of strong critical periods include monocular deprivation, filial imprinting, monaural occlusion, and Prefrontal Synthesis acquisition. These traits cannot be acquired after the end of the critical period.

Examples of weak critical periods include phoneme tuning, grammar processing, articulation control, vocabulary acquisition, music training, auditory processing, sport training, and many other traits that can be significantly improved by training at any age.

== Critical period mechanisms ==
=== Critical period opening ===
Critical periods of plasticity occur in the prenatal brain and continue throughout childhood until adolescence and are very limited during adulthood. Two major factors influence the opening of critical periods: cellular events (i.e. changes in molecular landscape) and sensory experience (i.e. hearing sound, visual input, etc.). Both need to coincide for the critical period to open properly. At the cellular level, critical periods are characterized by maturation of the inhibitory circuits. More precisely, factors such as brain-derived neurotrophic factor (BDNF) and orthodenticle homeobox 2 (Otx2) contribute to the maturation of a major class of inhibitory neurons: parvalbumin-positive interneurons (PV cells). Prior to the onset of the critical period, modulation of this circuit is hampered by early factors such as polysialic acid (PSA). PSA acts, in part, by preventing Otx2 interaction with PV cells. Soon after the opening of the critical period, PSA levels decrease, allowing PV cell maturation by activating inhibitory GABAa receptors that facilitate inhibitory circuit remodeling. Artificially removing PSA or experimentally manipulating inhibitory transmission can cause the critical period to open early. While the timing of these molecular events seems to be partially explained by clock genes, experience is crucial, as sensory deprivation experiments have been shown to interfere with the proper timing of critical periods.

=== Activity-dependent competition ===
Hebbian theory guides the idea of activity-dependent competition: if two neurons both have the potential to make a connection with a cell, the neuron that fires more will make the connection.

==== Ocular dominance ====
This phenomenon of activity-dependent competition is especially seen in the formation of ocular dominance columns within the visual system. Early in development, most of the visual cortex is binocular, meaning it receives roughly equal input from both eyes. Normally, as development progresses, the visual cortex will segregate into monocular columns that receive input from only one eye. However, if one eye is patched, or otherwise prevented from receiving sensory input, the visual cortex will shift to favor representation of the uncovered eye. This demonstrates activity-dependent competition and Hebbian theory because inputs from the uncovered eye make and retain more connections than the patched eye.

==== Axon growth ====
Axon formation and growth is another key part of plasticity and activity-dependent competition. Axon growth and branching has been shown to be inhibited when the neuron's electrical activity is suppressed below the level of an active neighbor. This shows that axonal growth dynamics are not independent but rather depend on the local circuits within which they are active (i.e. the activity of the other neurons competing for connections).

=== Microglia ===
Microglia inherently play a role in synaptic pruning during adolescence. As resident immune cells of the central nervous system, microglia's main role is phagocytosis and engulfment. Studies have found that during critical periods in the visual cortex, neural synapses become the target of microglial phagocytosis. Neurons who received less frequent input from retinal ganglion cells during early postnatal periods were more prone to be engulfed and pruned by microglia, as per monocular deprivation experiments. Similar results were found when manipulating G-coupled purinergic receptors on microglial processes. Blocking these receptors or performing a knockout experiment significantly lowered microglial interactions and synaptic pruning during the early visual cortex critical period. More recently, the expression of the complement component 4 gene has been found to significantly contribute to abnormally high levels of microglial synaptic pruning during early stages of development in the neurons and microglia of schizophrenics, suggesting a genomic connection between the immune system and critical periods.

=== Spine motility ===
Dendritic spine motility is the altering of the dendritic morphology of a neuron, specifically the appearing and disappearing of the small protrusions known as spines. In early postnatal development, spine motility has been found to be at very high levels. Due to its most pronounced occurrence during postnatal days 11 through 15, spine motility is thought to have a role in neurogenesis. Motility levels significantly decrease before the start of the visual cortex critical period and monocular deprivation experiments show that motility levels steadily decrease until the critical period is over, hinting that motility might not be explicitly involved in this process. However, binocular deprivation before eye-opening resulted in a significant up-regulation of spine motility until the peak of the critical period, resulting in controversial findings regarding the role of dendritic spine motility.

=== Excitatory-inhibitory balance ===
Another critical component of neuronal plasticity is the balance of excitatory and inhibitory inputs. Early in development, GABA, the major inhibitory neurotransmitter in the adult brain, exhibits an excitatory effect on its target neurons. However, due to changes in internal chloride levels due to the up-regulation of potassium chloride pumps, GABA then switches to inhibitory synaptic transmission. The maturation of the GABAergic inhibitory system helps to trigger the onset of critical periods. Strengthened GABAergic systems can induce an early critical period, while weaker GABAergic inputs can delay or even prevent plasticity. Inhibition also guides plasticity once the critical period has begun. For example, lateral inhibition is especially important in guiding columnar formation in the visual cortex. Hebbian theory provides insight on the importance of inhibition within neural networks: without inhibition, there would be more synchronous firing and therefore more connections, but with inhibition, fewer excitatory signals get through, allowing only the more salient connections to mature.

=== Critical period closure ===
==== Perineuronal nets ====
Critical period closure has been shown to be modulated by the maturation of inhibitory circuits, mediated by the formation of perineuronal nets around inhibitory neurons. Perineuronal nets (PNNs) are structures in the extracellular matrix formed by chondroitin sulfate proteoglycans, hyaluronan, and link proteins. These structures envelop the soma of inhibitory neurons in the central nervous system, appearing with age to stabilize mature circuits. PNN development coincides with the closure of critical periods, and both PNN formation and critical period timing is delayed in dark-rearing. For example, PNN digestion by ABC chondroitinase in rats leads to a shift in ocular dominance upon monocular deprivation, which is normally restricted to its critical period much earlier in development.

Additionally, PNNs are negatively charged, which is theorized to create a cation-rich environment around cells, potentially leading to an increased firing rate of inhibitory neurons, thereby allowing for increased inhibition after the formation of PNNs and helping to close the critical period. The role of PNNs in critical period closure is further supported by the finding that fast-spiking parvalbulmin-positive interneurons are often surrounded by PNNs.

Perineuronal nets have also been found to contain chemorepulsive factors, such as semaphorin3A, which restrict axon growth necessary for plasticity during critical periods. In all, these data suggest a role for PNNs in the maturation of CNS inhibition, the prevention of plastic axonal growth, and subsequently, critical period closure.

==== Myelin ====
Another mechanism that closes the critical period is myelination. Myelin sheaths are formed by oligodendrocytes in the CNS that wrap around segments of axons to increase their firing speed. Myelin is formed in the early stages of development and progresses in waves, with brain areas of later phylogenetic development (i.e. those associated with "higher" brain functions like the frontal lobes) having later myelination. The maturation of myelination in intracortical layers coincides with critical period closure in mice, which has led to further research on the role of myelination on critical period duration.

Myelin is known to bind many different axonal growth inhibitors that prevent plasticity seen in critical periods. The Nogo receptor is expressed in myelin and binds to the axonal growth inhibitors Nogo and Myelin-associated glycoprotein (MAG) (among others), preventing axon growth in mature, myelinated neurons. Instead of affecting the timing of the critical period, mutations of the Nogo receptor prolong the critical period temporarily. A mutation of the Nogo receptor in mice was found to extend the critical period for monocular dominance from around 20–32 days to 45 or 120 days, suggesting a likely role of the myelin Nogo receptor in critical period closure.

Additionally, the effects of myelination are temporally limited, since myelination itself may have its own critical period and timing. Research has shown that social isolation of mice leads to reduced myelin thickness and poor working memory, but only during a juvenile critical period. In primates, isolation is correlated with abnormal changes in white matter potentially due to decreased myelination.

In all, myelin and its associated receptors bind several important axonal growth inhibitors which help close the critical period. The timing of this myelination, however, is dependent on the brain region and external factors such as the social environment.

=== Neuromodulation ===
While the presence or absence of sensory experiences most robustly shapes brain development during the critical period, the behavioral context (i.e. the amount of attention, arousal, fear and reward experienced) concurrent with the sensory inputs have been suggested to be important in regulating the brain remodeling mechanisms. In terms of brain connectivity, these behavioral and contextual inputs activate the neuromodulatory system, which have substantial connectivity to the cortex. The molecular effectors released by the neuromodulatory system are called neuromodulators, which include acetylcholine, dopamine, and noradrenaline among others. Investigating the effect of these molecules, as well as the neurons that release and bind them, has been one approach to elucidate the biology of neuromodulation. Research using this approach has highlighted the role of neuromodulation in sensory processing during the critical period. For example, in kittens, a shift in ocular dominance resulting from monocular deprivation during the critical period is reduced by combined destruction of noradrenergic and cholinergic neurons. In addition, prenatal exposure to selective serotonin reuptake inhibitors (SSRI) causes a shift in perceptual narrowing on language to earlier in development. On the other hand, neuromodulatory stimulation has been shown to induce brain plasticity in adult mice. While being subjected to cholinergic or dopaminergic stimulation, adult mice listening to a tone of specific frequency exhibited expansion of the tonotopic area in the auditory cortex that responds specifically to sounds of that frequency.

Mechanistically, neuromodulation is increasingly being recognized for its fine-tuning of the PV cell-mediated inhibition of excitatory pyramidal neurons' soma. Central to the neuromodulatory regulation of PV cell activity is the existence of distinct subsets of inhibitory neurons, which are responsive to activation by neuromodulators and which inhibit PV cells. Within these cells, some also inhibit specific pyramidal cell dendrites. By inhibiting PV cells activity, the neuromodulator-sensitive inhibitory cells such as those expressing vasoactive intestinal peptide (VIP) or somatostatin (SST) lift the inhibition of the pyramidal neurons; in other words, the activity of VIP and SST-expressing cells result in the disinhibition of pyramidal neurons. Then, by inhibiting only certain dendritic branches of these now dis-inhibited pyramidal neurons, the neuromodulation-activated cells allow select sensory inputs to excite the pyramidal neurons and be represented in the brain circuitry. Thus, in a landscape of global inhibition by maturing inhibitory signaling, neuromodulation allows windows of dis-inhibition, temporally and spatially, that allow behaviorally important sensory inputs the opportunity to influence the brain.

== Linguistics ==
=== First language acquisition ===
The critical period hypothesis (CPH) states that the first few years of life constitute the time during which language develops readily and after which (sometime between age 5 and puberty) language acquisition is much more difficult and ultimately less successful. The hypothesis that language is acquired during a critical period was first proposed by neurologists Wilder Penfield and Lamar Roberts in 1959 and popularized by linguist Eric Lenneberg in 1967. Lenneberg argued for the hypothesis based on evidence that children who experience brain injury early in life develop far better language skills than adults with similar injuries.

Maria Montessori was one of the earlier educators to draw attention to this phenomenon, which she called "sensitive periods" and made a central part of her philosophy of education.

The two most famous cases of children who failed to acquire language after the critical period are the feral children Victor of Aveyron and Genie. However, the tragic circumstances of these cases and the moral and ethical impermissibility of replicating them make it difficult to draw conclusions about them. The children may have been cognitively disabled from infancy, or their inability to develop language may have resulted from the profound neglect and abuse they suffered.

Many subsequent researchers have further developed the CPH, most notably Elissa Newport and Rachel Mayberry. Studies conducted by these researchers demonstrated that profoundly deaf individuals who are not exposed to a sign language as children never achieve full proficiency, even after 30 years of daily use. While the effect is most profound for individuals who receive no sign language input until after the age of 12, even those deaf people who began learning a sign language at age 5 were significantly less fluent than native deaf signers (whose exposure to a sign language began at birth). Early language exposure also affects the ability to learn a second language later in life: profoundly deaf individuals with early language exposure achieve comparable levels of proficiency in a second language to hearing individuals with early language exposure. In contrast, deaf individuals without early language exposure perform far worse.

Other evidence comes from neuropsychology where it is known that adults well beyond the critical period are more likely to suffer permanent language impairment from brain damage than are children, believed to be due to youthful resiliency of neural reorganization.

Steven Pinker discusses the CPH in his book, The Language Instinct. According to Pinker, language must be viewed as a concept rather than a specific language because the sounds, grammar, meaning, vocabulary, and social norms play an important role in the acquisition of language. Physiological changes in the brain are also conceivable causes for the terminus of the critical period for language acquisition. As language acquisition is crucial during this phase, similarly infant–parent attachment is crucial for social development of the infant. An infant learns to trust and feel safe with the parent, but there are cases in which the infant might be staying at an orphanage where it does not receive the same attachment with their caregiver. Research shows that infants who were unable to develop this attachment had major difficulty in keeping close relationships, and had maladaptive behaviors with adopted parents.

The discussion of language critical period suffers from the lack of a commonly accepted definition of language. Some aspects of language, such as phoneme tuning, grammar processing, articulation control, and vocabulary acquisition can be significantly improved by training at any age and therefore have weak critical periods. Other aspects of language, such as prefrontal synthesis, have strong critical periods and cannot be acquired after the end of the critical period. Consequently, when language is discussed in general, without dissection into components, arguments can be constructed both in favor and against the strong critical period of L1 acquisition.

=== Second language acquisition ===
The theory has often been extended to a critical period for second language acquisition (SLA), which has influenced researchers in the field on both sides of the spectrum, supportive and unsupportive of CPH, to explore. However, the nature of this phenomenon has been one of the most fiercely debated issues in psycholinguistics and cognitive science in general for decades.

Certainly, older learners of a second language rarely achieve the native-like fluency that younger learners display, despite often progressing faster than children in the initial stages. This is generally accepted as evidence supporting the CPH. Incorporating the idea, "younger equals better" by Penfield, David Singleton (1995) states that in learning a second language there are many exceptions, noting that five percent of adult bilinguals master a second language even though they begin learning it when they are well into adulthood—long after any critical period has presumably come to a close. The critical period hypothesis holds that first language acquisition must occur before cerebral lateralization completes, at about the age of puberty. One prediction of this hypothesis is that second language acquisition is relatively fast, successful, and qualitatively similar to first language only if it occurs before the age of puberty. To grasp a better understanding of SLA, it is essential to consider linguistic, cognitive, and social factors rather than age alone, as they are all essential to the learner's language acquisition.

Over the years, researchers have tried to find evidence in support of or against the critical periods for second language acquisition. Many have found evidence that young children acquire language more easily than adults, but there are also special cases of adults acquiring a second language with native-like proficiency. Thus it has been difficult for researchers to separate correlation from causation.

In 1989, Jacqueline S. Johnson and Elissa L. Newport found support for the claim that second languages are more easily acquired before puberty, or more specifically before the age of seven. They tested second language learners of English who arrived in the United States at various ages ranging from three to thirty-nine, and found that there was a decline in grammatical correctness after the age of seven. Johnson and Newport attributed this claim to a decline in language learning ability with age. Opponents of the critical period argue that the difference in language ability found by Johnson and Newport could be due to the different types of input that children and adults receive; children received reduced input while adults receive more complicated structures.

Additional evidence against a strict critical period is also found in the work of Pallier et al. (2003) who found that children adopted to France from Korea were able to become native-like in their performance of French even after the critical period for phonology. Their experiment may represent a special case where subjects must lose their first language in order to more perfectly acquire their second.

There is also some debate as to how one can judge the native-like quality of the speech participants produce and what exactly it means to be a near-native speaker of a second language. White et al. found that it is possible for non-native speakers of a language to become native-like in some aspects, but those aspects are influenced by their first language.

Recently, a connectionist model has been developed to explain the changes that take place in second language learning assuming that sensitive period affects lexical learning and syntactic learning parts of the system differently, which sheds further light on how first and second language acquisition changes over the course of learners development.

== Vision ==

In mammals, neurons in the brain that process vision actually develop after birth based on signals from the eyes. A landmark experiment by David H. Hubel and Torsten Wiesel (1963) showed that cats that had one eye sewn shut from birth to three months of age (monocular deprivation) only fully developed vision in the open eye. They showed that columns in the primary visual cortex receiving inputs from the other eye took over the areas that would normally receive input from the deprived eye. In general electrophysiological analyses of axons and neurons in the lateral geniculate nucleus showed that the visual receptive field properties was comparable to adult cats. However, the layers of cortex that were deprived had less activity and fewer responses were isolated. The kittens had abnormally small ocular dominance columns (part of the brain that processes sight) connected to the closed eye, and abnormally large, wide columns connected to the open eye. Because the critical period time had elapsed, it would be impossible for the kittens to alter and develop vision in the closed eye. This did not happen to adult cats even when one eye was sewn shut for a year because they had fully developed their vision during their critical period. Later experiments in monkeys found similar results consistent with the strong critical period.

In a follow-up experiment, Hubel and Wiesel (1963) explored the cortical responses present in kittens after binocular deprivation; they found it difficult to find any active cells in the cortex, and the responses they did get were either slow-moving or fast-fatiguing. Furthermore, the cells that did respond selected for edges and bars with distinct orientation preferences. Nevertheless, these kittens developed normal binocularity. Hubel and Wiesel first explained the mechanism, known as orientation selectivity, in the mammalian visual cortex. Orientation tuning, a model that originated with their model, is a concept in which receptive fields of neurons in the LGN excite a cortical simple cell and are arranged in rows. This model was important because it was able to describe a strong critical period for the proper development of normal ocular dominance columns in the lateral geniculate nucleus, and thus able to explain the effects of monocular deprivation during this critical period. The critical period for cats is about three months and for monkeys, about six months.

In a similar experiment, Antonini and Stryker (1993) examined the anatomical changes that can be observed after monocular deprivation. They compared geniculocortical axonal arbors in monocularly deprived animals in the long term (4 weeks) to short term (6–7 days) during the critical period established by Hubel and Wiesel (1993). They found that in the long term, monocular deprivation causes reduced branching at the end of neurons, while the amount of afferents allocated to the nondeprived eye increased. Even in the short term, Antonini and Stryker (1993) found that geniculocortical neurons were similarly affected. This supports the aforementioned concept of a critical period for proper neural development for vision in the cortex.

Studies of people whose sight has been restored after a long blindness (whether from birth or a later point in life) reveal that they cannot necessarily recognize objects and faces (as opposed to color, motion, and simple geometric shapes). Some hypothesize that being blind during childhood prevents some part of the visual system necessary for these higher-level tasks from developing properly. The general belief that a critical period lasts until age 5 or 6 was challenged by a 2007 study that found that older patients could improve these abilities with years of exposure. The critical period of sensitivity cannot be predicted from the period of development. Recent work relating to visual deprivation and recovery suggests that some recovery can occur outside critical periods of sensitivity and periods of development.

Expression of the protein Lynx1 has been associated with the normal end of the critical period for synaptic plasticity in the visual system.

== Imprinting ==
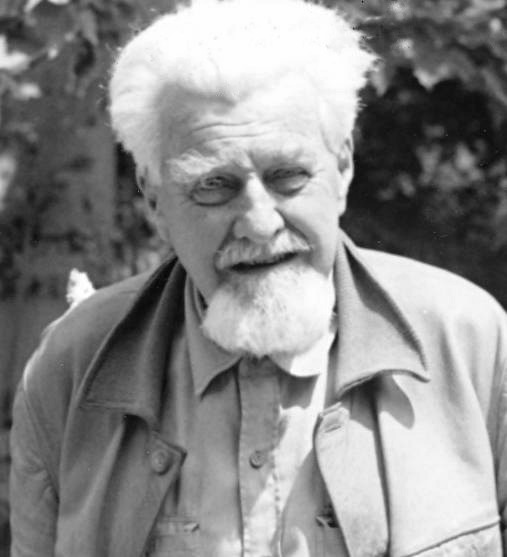
Konrad Lorenz

In psychology, imprinting is any type of rapid learning that occurs in a particular life stage. While this rapid learning is independent of the behavioral outcome, it also establishes it and can affect behavioral responses to different stimuli. Konrad Lorenz is well known for his classic studies of filial imprinting in graylag geese. From 1935 to 1938, he presented himself to a group of newly hatched gosling and took note of how he was instantly accepted, followed, and called to as if he were the one who laid them himself. As the first moving object they encountered, Lorenz studied the phenomenon in how quickly the geese were able to form such an irreversible bond. Through his work he demonstrated that this only developed during a brief "critical period", which was about a few hours after hatching, suggesting a strong critical period.

Lorenz also discovered a long-lasting effect of his studies, and that was a shift in the species' sexual imprinting as a result from imprinting upon a foster mother of a second species. For certain species, when raised by a second one, they develop and retain imprinted preferences and approach the second species they were raised by rather than choose their own, if given a choice.

Imprinting serves as the distinguishing factor between one's own mother and other mother figures. The mother and the infant both identify with each other, this is a strong bonding moment for humans. It provides a sort of model or guide to adult behaviors in addition to other factors such as nurture, protection in infancy, guidance, and nourishment. The imprinting process, Lorenz also found, brought about a sense of familiarity for the young animals. When such a strong bond is formed at such an early stage, it creates a sense of security and comfort for the subject and actually encourages the imprinting behavior.

Pheromones play a key role in the imprinting process, they trigger a biochemical response in the recipient, leading to a confirmed identification in the other individual. If direct contact between mother and infant is not maintained during the critical imprinting period, then the mother goose may reject the infant because she is unfamiliar with her newborn's scent. If that does happen, then the infant's life would be in jeopardy unless it were claimed by a substitute mother, possibly leading to awkward social behavior in later life. In relation to humans, a newborn during the critical period identifies with its mother's and other peoples' scents since its scent is one of the most developed senses at that stage in life. The newborn uses this pheromone identification to seek the people it identifies with, when in times of distress, hunger, and discomfort as a survival skill. Inferences could be made for newborns based upon Lorenz's studies. When imprinting on their mothers, newborns look to them for nourishment, a sense of security, and comfort. Human newborns are among the most helpless known with orangutan newborns ranking second. Newborns of these species have a very limited array of innate survival abilities. Their most important and functional ability is to form bonds with close individuals who are able to keep them alive. Imprinting is a crucial factor of the critical period because it facilitates the newborn's abilities to form bonds with other individuals, from infancy to adulthood.

== Auditory processing ==
Many studies have supported a correlation between the type of auditory stimuli present in the early postnatal environment and the development on the topographical and structural development of the auditory system.

First reports on critical periods came from deaf children and animals that received a cochlear implant to restore hearing. Approximately at the same time, both an electroencephalographic study by Sharma, Dorman and Spahr and an in-vivo investigation of the cortical plasticity in deaf cats by Kral and colleagues demonstrated that the adaptation to the cochlear implant is subject to an early, developmental sensitive period. The closure of sensitive periods likely involves a multitude of processes that in their combination make it difficult to reopen these behaviorally. The understanding of the mechanisms behind critical periods has consequences for medical therapy of hearing loss. M. Merzenich and colleagues showed that during an early critical period, noise exposure can affect the frequency organization of the auditory cortex.

Recent studies have examined the possibility of a critical period for thalamocortical connectivity in the auditory system. For example, Zhou and Merzenich (2008) studied the effects of noise on development in the primary auditory cortex in rats. In their study, rats were exposed to pulsed noise during the critical period and the effect on cortical processing was measured. Rats that were exposed to pulsed noise during the critical period had cortical neurons that were less able to respond to repeated stimuli; the early auditory environment interrupted normal structural organization during development.

In a related study, Barkat, Polley and Hensch (2011) looked at how exposure to different sound frequencies influences the development of the tonotopic map in the primary auditory cortex and the ventral medial geniculate body. In this experiment, mice were reared either in normal environments or in the presence of 7 kHz tones during early postnatal days. They found that mice that were exposed to an abnormal auditory environment during a critical period P11-P15 had an atypical tonotopic map in the primary auditory cortex. These studies support the notion that exposure to certain sounds within the critical period can influence the development of tonotopic maps and the response properties of neurons. Critical periods are important for the development of the brain for the function from a pattern of connectivity. In general, the early auditory environment influences the structural development and response specificity of the primary auditory cortex.

=== Absolute pitch ===
Absolute pitch manifests itself almost always before adolescence and rarely if ever among individuals who are first exposed to music after mid-childhood, suggesting that exposure to music or similar phenomena (e.g., tonal languages) in early to mid-childhood is a necessary condition for its development or refinement. Studies that ask musicians and non-musicians to sing or hum well-known popular songs that have definitive recordings (and hence are sung in standardized keys) show that—on average—participants sing within a semitone of the standardized key but that outside the small subset of participants with absolute pitch there is broad variation (the "bell curve" that reflects the degree of approximation to the standard key is broad and flat). These results suggest that almost all humans have some innate aptitude for absolute pitch recognition—though other factors may enhance or limit the level of that aptitude. Also, the results' conjunction with the aforementioned chronological observations suggests that early to mid-childhood exposure to environments whose interpretation depends on pitch is a developmental "trigger" for whatever aptitude an individual possesses.

== Vestibular system ==
In our vestibular system, neurons are undeveloped at neuronal birth and mature during the critical period of the first 2–3 postnatal weeks. Hence, disruption of maturation during this period can cause changes in normal balance and movement through space. Animals with abnormal vestibular development tend to have irregular motor skills. Studies have consistently shown that animals with genetic vestibular deficiencies during this critical period have altered vestibular phenotypes, most likely as a result of insufficient input from the semicircular canals and dopaminergic abnormalities. Moreover, exposure to abnormal vestibular stimuli during the critical period is associated with irregular motor development. Children with hypofunctioning vestibular receptors frequently have delayed motor development. The results of the studies done on ferrets and rats reinforced the idea that the vestibular system is very important to motor development during the initial neonatal period. If the vestibular receptors are present during the initial six months to a year when the infant is learning to sit and stand, then the child may develop motor control and balance normally.

The vestibulo-ocular reflex (VOR) is a reflex eye movement that stabilizes images on the retina during head movement. It produces an eye movement in the direction opposite to head movement, thus preserving the image on the center of the visual field. Studies in fish and amphibians revealed a sensitivity in their VOR. They launched into space flight for 9–10, some with developing VORs and others with already developed reflexes. The fish with developing reflexes developed an upward bend in their tails. The altered gravity resulted in a shift of orientation. Those who were already matured with the reflex were insensitive to the microgravity exposure.

== Memory ==
Recent studies also support the possibility of a critical period for the development of neurons that mediate memory processing. Experimental evidence supports the notion that young neurons in the adult dentate gyrus have a critical period (about 1–3 weeks after neuronal birth) during which they are integral to memory formation. Although the exact reasoning behind this observation is uncertain, studies suggest that the functional properties of neurons at this age make them most appropriate for this purpose; these neurons: (1) Remain hyperactive during the formation of memories; (2) are more excitable; and (3) More easily depolarizable due to GABAergic effects. It is also possible that hyperplasticity makes the neurons more useful in memory formation. If these young neurons had more plasticity than adult neurons in the same context, they could be more influential in smaller numbers. The role of these neurons in the adult dentate gyrus in memory processing is further supported by the fact that behavioral experiments have shown that an intact dentate gyrus is integral to hippocampal memory formation. It is speculated that the dentate gyrus acts as a relay station for information relating to memory storage. The likelihood of a critical period could change the way we view memory processing because it would ultimately mean that the collection of neurons present is constantly being replenished as new neurons replace old ones. If a critical period does indeed exist, this could possibly mean that: (1) Diverse populations of neurons that represent events occurring soon after one another may connect those events temporally in the memory formation and processing; or (2) these different populations of neurons may distinguish between similar events, independent of temporal position; or (3) separate populations may mediate the formation of new memories when the same events occur frequently.

== See also ==
- Behavioral cusp
- Child development
- Critical period hypothesis
- Developmental psychology
- Malleable intelligence
- Universal grammar
