= Monocular deprivation =

Monocular deprivation is an experimental technique used by neuroscientists to study central nervous system plasticity. Generally, one of an animal's eyes is sutured shut during a period of high cortical plasticity (4–5 weeks-old in mice (Gordon 1997)). This manipulation serves as an animal model for amblyopia, a permanent deficit in visual sensation not due to abnormalities in the eye (which occurs, for example, in children who grow up with cataracts - even after cataract removal, they do not see as well as others).

== Background ==
David Hubel and Torsten Wiesel (who won the Nobel Prize in Physiology for their elucidation of receptive field properties of cells in primary visual cortex) first performed the technique in felines. Kittens, although less-closely related evolutionarily to humans even than rodents, have a remarkably similar visual system to humans. They found that ocular dominance columns (the orderly clustering of V1 neurons representing visual input from one or both eyes) were dramatically disrupted when one eye was sewn shut for 2 months. In the normal feline, about 85% of cells are responsive to input to both eyes; in the monocularly-deprived animals, no cells receive input from both eyes. The monocular deprivation often leads to amblyopia that is irreversible.

This physiological change was paralleled by dramatic anatomical changes. The layers representing the deprived eye in the lateral geniculate nucleus of the thalamus are atrophied. In V1, ocular dominance columns representing the open eye are dramatically enlarged, at the expense of cortical surface area representing the sutured eye (Fig. 1 - Effect of monocular deprivation on ocular dominance columns. Light areas represent V1 neurons receiving input from an eye which has been injected with radioactive amino acid. Dark areas represent neurons receiving input from the other, noninjected, eye. Image A represents normal ocular dominance columns; Image B represents ocular dominance columns after monocular deprivation). These results were confirmed in the monkey.

In felines, the critical period (the period during which deprivation could cause permanent deficits) can last up to one year with the peak occurring around 4 weeks. In monkeys, the critical period peak is around 6 months. Depriving an eye, for even a few days, during this period is sufficient to cause major changes in ocular-dominance-column anatomy and physiology. However, the results of monocular deprivation in adult cats are not the same. The ocular dominance columns do not show results of being disturbed even after the adult cat has had one of its eyes shut for over a year.
