= Polysialic acid =

Class of chemical compounds

Polysialic acid is an unusual posttranslational modification that occurs on neural cell adhesion molecules (NCAM). Polysialic acid is considerably anionic. This strong negative charge gives this modification the ability to change the protein's surface charge and binding ability. In the synapse, polysialation of NCAM prevents its ability to bind to NCAMs on the adjacent membrane.

== Structure ==
Polysialic acid (polySia) is polymer of linearly repeating monomer units of α2,8- and α2,9-glycosidic linked sialic acid residues. Sialic acid refers to carboxylated 9-carbon sugars, 2-keto-3-dexoxy-D-glycero-nononic acids. An unusual property of this sugar is that it often polymerizes into polySia. This is accomplished by attaching the monomers to the nonreducing end of the glycan. This mostly consists of Neu5Ac subunits. It is polyanionic and bulky, meaning there is little ability to reach its central molecules. polySia is useful in signaling in vertebrates and on the cell surface of few glycoproteins and glycolipids causing modifications, and it has been recently found that the function of polySia relates almost directly to its degree of polymerization. The number of units can range from 8 to greater than 400. This vast range causes differences in the polySia's ability to adhere different cells, assist in cellular migration, synapse formation, and regulate adhesion in nerve cells by modeling and formating them. polySia's most prominent role is in post-translational modifications in a few proteins, with the main one being NCAM. polySia links to adhesion molecules causing their adhesive properties to be subdued allowing for the detailed control of cell migration and cell to cell relations. This is caused by polySia's bulky and polyanionic properties.

The human body produces polySia naturally and attaches it to a various number of proteins. This is done by linking polySia on the α2,3- or α2,6- terminal of the glycoprotein. O-linked glycosylation through threonine or N-linked glycosylation through asparagine is employed. This polySia linkage is found in proteins such as NCAM, E-selectin ligand 1 (ESL-1), C–C chemokine receptor type 7 (CCR7), synaptic cell adhesion molecule-1 (SynCAM-1), neuropilin-2 (NRP-2), the CD36 scavenger receptor found in the milk of humans, and the α-subunit of the voltage-sensitive sodium channel. The synthesis of polySia is enzymatically formed by α2,8-sialyltransferase (ST8Sia) in a Type II transmembrane protein located on the Golgi Apparatus membrane. ST8Sia does this by adding sialic acids to the terminal end of the glycan through the CMP-sialic acid donor at various lengths depending on necessity. The length is controlled extensively by the expression of polysialyltransferase enzymes, once again controlling the function of polySia.

== Discovery and methods of detection ==
polySia was discovered in E. coli K-235 by Barry and Goebel in 1957. E. coli is an encapsulated, gram-negative bacteria in which Barry and Goebel studied, pinpointing polySia, which they called colominic acid. Following this discovery, multiple other bacterial capsules abundant in glycans were found to contain polySia. This included Neisseia meningitidis serogroups B and C in 1975. This was done by the use of a horse anti-polySia polyclonal antibody, being one of the first effective immunochemical probes. This was revolutionary as the anti-polySia antibodies were used to find polySia on proteins and cells. Mannheimia haemolytica A2, Moraxella nonliquifaciens, and E. coli K92 were found in 2013. Due to the capsule containing polySia, many scientists have tried to generate vaccines for these specific bacteria, notoriously difficult to target. However, their successes have been numbered as α2,8-polySia is naturally produced by humans. Another issue is that polySia found in bacteria does not produce a solid or consistent immune response.

Another method of polySia detection relies on molecular labeling with fluorescence. This process, started in 1998, involves exposing α2→8-linked N-acylneuraminic acid (Neu5Acyl) to periodate oxidation causing the terminals to be oxidized and in between untouched. If C_{9} compounds are observed after this exposure it indicates the presence of polySia. The way these can be numbered is by anion exchange chromatography after periodate oxidation with the label 1,2-diamino-4,5-methylenedioxybenzene (DMB) on C_{7} and C_{9}. It is known that there are many different structures of polySia and these were difficult to recognize and detect until this fluorescent labeling, making it very advantageous.

== Function in humans ==
polySia is involved in many natural human functions. The major examples include membranes, neuron signaling, the immune system, neutrophil extracellular trap formation, and macrophage and microglia function. First, polySia makes membrane modifications due to interactions with a variety of factors. These could include repulsive forces between the polyanionic polySia and the mostly negatively charged glycocalyx. Because of these interactions the membrane is edited in its ability to interact with other cells, its surface charge distribution, inter-membrane interaction, pH, and membrane potential. Hydration and charge were noted before and after removing polySia from a membrane and a 25% decrease in the distance between cells was observed. This is due to the anti-adhesive properties of polySia. polySia does not only have repulsive interactions, as there are positive charge molecules located in lipid rafts, such as NCAM. The interaction between polySia and NCAM greatly affects NCAM's signaling ability as its composition is altered when they meet. Other forms of neuron signaling polySia is involved in include brain-derived neurotrophic factor (BDNF) and fibroblast growth factor 2 (FGF2). With nearly the same mechanism, the act of polysialylation causes BDNF or FGF2 complexes through electrostatic interactions. This allows for the binding of polySia and these complexes causing polySia to be a reservoir. polySia then regulates the concentration of neurotrophins. Because they are not allowed to diffuse, signaling is more efficient. polySia is also found on immune cell surfaces. Some of the proteins are known, but many are not and the mechanisms are still being studied. However, it is known that polySia is in regulatory functions in the immune system leading to protection from invaders and response to damaged tissue. polySia is involved in NETosis which is a reactionary function of the body in the presence of foreign invaders. It is the intentional death of neutrophils. polySia ensures that this targeted cell death does not kill cells that are healthy and unaffected, as well as containing antimicrobial attributes. This is done by polySia by binding to lactoferrin, another antimicrobial molecule, surrounding neutrophils. polySia binding causes a tighter shell of lactoferrin around the cell membrane. polySia binds with Siglec-11 allowing for the regulation of microglia through exosomes. This shows that polySia binding with Siglec-11 causes a delay in neurodegeneration and control of neuroinflammation. polySia also limits inflammation in macrophages. polySia was found to have limited the expression of tumour necrosis factor (TNF).
