= Ocular dominance column =

Ocular dominance columns are stripes of neurons in the visual cortex of certain mammals (including humans) that respond preferentially to input from one eye or the other. The columns span multiple cortical layers, and are laid out in a striped pattern across the surface of the striate cortex (V1). The stripes lie perpendicular to the orientation columns.

Ocular dominance columns were important in early studies of cortical plasticity, as it was found that monocular deprivation causes the columns to degrade, with the non-deprived eye assuming control of more of the cortical cells.

It is believed that ocular dominance columns must be important in binocular vision. Surprisingly, however, many squirrel monkeys either lack or partially lack ocular dominance columns, which would not be expected if they are useful. This has led some to question whether they serve a purpose, or are just a byproduct of development.

== History ==
=== Discovery ===
Ocular dominance columns were discovered in the 1960s by Hubel and Wiesel as part of their Nobel Prize winning work on the structure of the visual cortex in cats. Ocular dominance columns have since been found in many animals, such as ferrets, macaques, and humans. Notably, they are also absent in many animals with binocular vision, such as rats.

== Structure ==
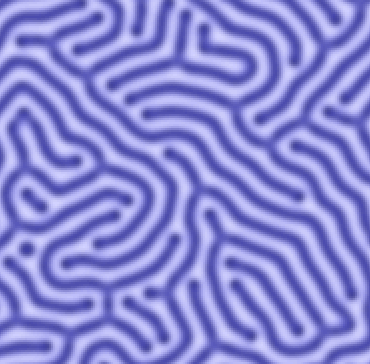
A simulation of the ocular dominance column pattern, as might be seen if the surface of V1 were colored according to eye preference.

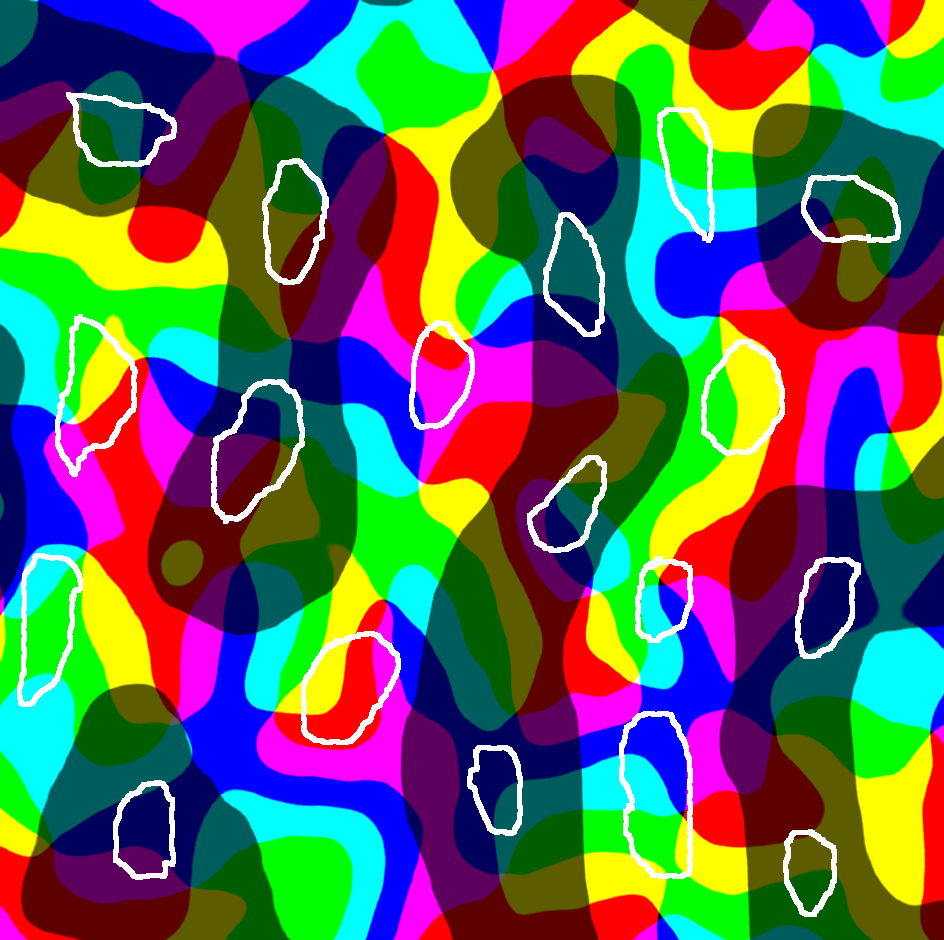
A typical map of the relationship between ocular dominance, orientation, and cytochrome oxidase. Dark and light areas represent neurons that respond preferentially to the left and right eye. Colors represent orientation selectivity (Note: This means, for example, that neurons in the areas marked in red fire more when a vertical edge is visible, green when a horizontal edge is visible, orange when 45°, etc.) of the neurons. Areas outlined in white have high levels of cytochrome oxidase (function not yet established). Notice that the centers of orientation "pinwheels" and cytochrome oxidase blobs both tend to be in line with the centers of the ocular dominance columns, but there is no obvious relation between orientation and cytochrome oxidase.

Ocular dominance columns are stripe shaped regions of the primary visual cortex that lie perpendicular to the orientation columns, as can be seen in the accompanying figure. Different species have somewhat different morphologies and levels of organization. For example, humans, cats, ferrets, and macaques all have fairly well defined columns, while squirrel monkeys have quite variable columns. There is even variation in expression in individuals of the same species and in different parts of the cortex of the same individual. The columns are innervated by input from the lateral geniculate nucleus (LGN) into cortical layer 4 and have mostly reciprocal projections to many other parts of the visual cortex.

=== Relation to other features of V1 ===
The ocular dominance columns cover the primary (striate) visual cortex, with the exception of monocular regions of the cortical map corresponding to peripheral vision and the blind spot. If the columns corresponding to one eye were colored, a pattern similar to that shown in the accompanying figure would be visible when looking at the surface of the cortex. However, the same region of cortex could also be colored by the direction of edge that it responds to, resulting in the orientation columns, which are laid out in a characteristic pinwheel shape. (Note: A very good analogy for this is the idea of coloring a map. Just like a map of Asia could be colored by religion or by language, the columns are not physical things but regions defined by shared attributes. Also much like a map of religion the borders tend to be fuzzy with no clear distinction between one area and the next columns often don't have sharp borders. Similarly, there may be overlap, just as people at the border between France and Germany are a mixture of French speakers, German speakers, or bilingual. There are even occasional neurons belonging to the ipsilateral eye in a contralateral column just like the occasional Portuguese speaker may be found in China. It was once believed the columns were discrete units with sharp borders but the idea of fuzzy, mostly continuous regions is now preferred.) Similarly, there are columns in the cortex that have high levels of the protein cytochrome oxidase. These are called cytochrome oxidase "blobs" because of their scattered blob-like appearance.

All three types of column are present in the visual cortex of humans and macaques, among other animals. In macaques, it was found that both blobs and pinwheel centers tend to lie in the center of ocular dominance columns, but no particular relation has been found between pinwheel centers and blobs. In humans, the layout of the columns is similar; however, humans have somewhat variable column expression with at least one subject having disordered columns similar to those commonly found in squirrel monkeys.

Most early models of the columns supposed that there were discrete "modules" or "hypercolumns" tiling the cortex, consisting of a repeating unit containing a full set of orientation and ocular dominance columns. While such units can be constructed, the map of columns is so distorted that there is no repeating structure and no clear boundaries between modules. Additionally, practically every combination of having or not having orientation, dominance, and cytochrome oxidase columns has been observed in one species or another. Further confusing the issue, squirrel monkeys don't always express columns, and even when they do the cytochrome oxidase blobs are not in register with the ocular dominance columns.

== Development ==
=== Formation ===
There is no consensus yet as to how ocular dominance columns are initially developed. One possibility is that they develop through Hebbian learning triggered by spontaneous activity coming from retinal waves in the eyes of the developing fetus, or from the LGN. Another possibility is that axonal guidance cues may guide the formation, or a combination of mechanisms may be at work. It is known that ocular dominance columns develop before birth, which indicates that if an activity dependent mechanism is involved it must work based on intrinsic activity rather than being sensory experience dependent. It is known that spontaneous waves of activity in the retina occur before birth and that these waves are crucial for eye specific segregation of inputs to the LGN by correlating the activity of nearby neurons. Similarly, the correlated activation for the retinal waves may direct development of the ocular dominance columns, which receive input from the LGN. Similar spontaneous activity in the cortex may also play a role. In any case, it has been shown that disrupting the retinal waves at least alters the pattern of ocular dominance columns.

=== Plasticity ===
==== Sensitive periods ====
Although the ocular dominance columns are formed before birth, there is a period after birth—formerly called a "critical period" and now called a "sensitive period"—when the ocular dominance columns may be modified by activity dependent plasticity. This plasticity is so strong that if the signals from both eyes are blocked the ocular dominance columns will completely desegregate. Similarly, if one eye is closed ("monocular deprivation"), removed("enucleation"), or silenced during the sensitive period, the size of the columns corresponding to the removed eye shrink dramatically.

=== Models ===
Many models have been proposed to explain the development and plasticity of the ocular dominance columns. In general these models can be split into two categories, those that posit formation via chemotaxis and those that posit a Hebbian activity dependent mechanism. Generally, chemotaxis models assume activity independent formation via the action of axon guidance molecules, with the structures only later being refined by activity, but there are now known to be activity dependent and activity modifying guidance molecules.

==== Modified Hebbian learning ====
One major model of the formation of the stripes seen in ocular dominance columns is that they form by Hebbian competition between axon terminals. The ocular dominance columns look like Turing patterns, which can be formed by modified Hebbian mechanisms. In a normal Hebbian model, if two neurons are connected to a neuron and fire together, they increase the strength of the synapses, "moving" (Note: The axon terminals don't actually move, but they grow in size and number according to level of activity, the net result being that the output from any particular neuron moves as it loses connection to one neuron and gains connection to another.) the axon terminals closer together. The model must be modified to incorporate incoming activity that is locally excitatory and long range inhibitory, because if this is not done then the column width will only be dependent on the width of the axonal arbor, and also segregation will often fail in the presence of inter eye correlation. This basic model has since been extended to be more physiologically plausible with the addition of long term potentiation and depression, synaptic normalization, neurotrophin release, reuptake, and spike-timing-dependent plasticity.

==== Chemotaxis ====
Chemotactic models posit the existence of axon guidance molecules that direct the initial formation of the ocular dominance columns. These molecules would guide the axons as they develop based on markers specific to the axons from each eye. All chemotactic models must take into account the activity dependent effects demonstrated in later development, but they have been called for because several pieces of evidence make entirely activity dependent formation unlikely. First, it has been shown that the ocular dominance columns in squirrel monkeys have mirror symmetry across the cortex. This is very unlikely to occur by activity dependent means because it implies a correlation between the nasal (Note: Toward or near the nose) retina of one eye and the temporal (Note: Toward or near the temple) retina of the other, which has not been observed. Furthermore, work in achiasmatic (Note: Having no optic chiasm) Belgian sheepdogs has shown that columns can form between the projections from the temporal and nasal retina of the same eye, clearly suggesting a nasal-temporal labeling, rather than contralateral vs. ipsilateral, which would be much easier to explain with activity dependent mechanisms. Despite this, a molecular label that directs the formation of the ocular dominance columns has never been found.

== Function ==
It has long been believed that ocular dominance columns play some role in binocular vision. Another candidate function for ocular dominance columns (and for columns in general) is the minimization of connection lengths and processing time, which could be evolutionarily important. It has even been suggested that the ocular dominance columns serve no function.

== See also ==
- Visual cortex
- Ocular dominance
- Orientation columns
- Amblyopia
