= Retinal waves =

Retinal waves are spontaneous bursts of action potentials that propagate in a wave-like fashion across the developing retina. These waves occur before rod and cone maturation and before vision can occur. The signals from retinal waves drive the activity in the dorsal lateral geniculate nucleus (dLGN) and the primary visual cortex. The waves are thought to propagate across neighboring cells in random directions determined by periods of refractoriness that follow the initial depolarization. Retinal waves are thought to have properties that define early connectivity of circuits and synapses between cells in the retina. There is still much debate about the exact role of retinal waves. Some contend that the waves are instructional in the formation of retinogeniculate pathways, while others argue that the activity is necessary but not instructional in the formation of retinogeniculate pathways.

== Discovery ==
One of the first scientists to theorize the existence of spontaneous cascades of electrical activity during retinal development was computational neurobiologist David J. Willshaw. He proposed that adjacent cells generate electrical activity in a wave-like formation through layers of interconnected pre-synaptic and postsynaptic cells. Activity propagating through a close span of pre- and postsynaptic cells is thought to result in strong electrical activity in comparison to pre- and postsynaptic cells that are farther apart, which results in weaker activity. Willshaw thought this difference in the firing strength and the location of cells was responsible for determining the activities' boundaries. The lateral movement of firing from neighboring cell to neighboring cell, starting in one random area of cells and moving throughout both the pre- and postsynaptic layers, is thought to be responsible for the formation of the retinotopic map. To simulate the cascade of electrical activity, Willshaw wrote a computer program to demonstrate the movement of electrical activity between pre- and postsynaptic cell layers. What Willshaw called "spontaneous patterned electrical activity" is today referred to as "retinal waves."

From this purely theoretical concept, Italian scientists Lucia Galli and Lamberto Maffei used animal models to observe electrical activity in ganglion cells of the retina. Before Galli and Maffei, retinal ganglion cell activity had never been recorded during prenatal development. To study ganglion activity, Galli and Maffei used premature rat retinas, between embryonic days 17 and 21, to record electrical activity. Several isolated, single cells were used for this study. The recordings showed cell activity was catalyzed from ganglion cells. Galli and Maffei speculated that the electrical activity seen in the retinal ganglion cells may be responsible for the formation of retinal synaptic connections and for the projections of retinal ganglion cells to the superior colliculus and lateral geniculate nucleus (LGN).

As the idea of retinal waves became established, neurobiologist Carla Shatz used calcium imaging and microelectrode recording to visualize the movement of action potentials in a wave-like formation. For more information on calcium imaging and microelectrode recording, see section below. The calcium imaging showed ganglion cells initiating the formation of retinal waves, along with adjacent amacrine cells, which take part in the movement of the electrical activity. Microelectrode recordings were also thought to show LGN neurons being driven by the wave-like formation of electrical activity across neighboring retinal ganglion cells. From these results, it was suggested that the waves of electrical activity were responsible for driving the pattern of spatiotemporal activity and also playing a role in the formation of the visual system during prenatal development.

Rachel Wong is another researcher involved in the study of retinal waves. Wong speculated that electrical activity, within the retina, is involved in the organization of retinal projections during prenatal development. More specifically, the electrical activity may be responsible for the segregation and organization of the dLGN. Wong also speculated that specific parts of the visual system, such as the ocular dominance columns, require some form of electrical activity in order to develop completely. She also believed being able to figure out the signals encoded by retinal waves, may allow scientists to better understand how retinal waves play a role in retinal development.

Some of the most recent research being conducted is attempting to better understand the encoded signals of retinal waves during development. According to research conducted by Evelyne Sernagor, it is thought that retinal waves are not just necessary for their spontaneous electrical activity but are also responsible for encoding information to be used in the formation of spatiotemporal patterns allowing retinal pathways to become more refined. Using turtles to test this concept, Sernagor used calcium imaging to look at the change in retinal waves during various stages of retinal development. From the study, at the very first stages of development, retinal waves fire quickly and repeatedly, causing what is thought to be a large wave of action potentials across the retina. However, as the turtle nears completion of development, the retinal waves gradually stop spreading and instead become immobile clumps of retinal ganglion cells. This is thought to be a result of GABA changing from excitatory to inhibitory during continual retinal development. Whether the change in retinal wave formation during development is unique to turtles, is still largely unknown.

== Observation of waves in other systems ==
Spontaneous generation and propagation of waves is seen elsewhere in developing circuits. Similar synchronized spontaneous activity early in development has been seen in neurons of the hippocampus, spinal cord, and auditory nuclei. Patterned activity shaping neuronal connections and control of synaptic efficiency in multiple systems including the retina are important for understanding interaction between presynaptic and postsynaptic cells that create precise connections essential to the function of the nervous system.

== Development ==
During development, communication via synapse is important between amacrine cells and other retinal interneurons as well as ganglion cells, which act as a substrate for retinal waves. There are three stages of development that characterize retinal wave activity in mammals. Before birth, the waves are mediated by non-synaptic currents, waves during the period from birth until 10 days after birth are mediated by the neurotransmitter acetylcholine acting on nicotinic acetylcholine receptors, and waves during the third period, from 10 days after birth to 2 weeks, are mediated by ionotropic glutamate receptors.

Chemical synapses during the cholinergic wave period involve the starburst amacrine cells (SACs) releasing acetylcholine onto other SACs, which then propagate waves. During this period, cholinergic wave production exceeds wave production via gap junctions, of which the signals are quite reduced. This signaling happens before bipolar cells form connections in the inner plexiform layer. SACs are thought to be the source of retinal waves because spontaneous depolarizations have been observed without synaptic excitation.

Cholinergic wave activity eventually dies out, and the release of glutamate in bipolar cells generates waves. Bipolar cells differentiate later than amacrine and ganglion cells, which could be the cause for this change in wave behavior. The change from cholinergic mediation to glutamatergic mediation occurs when bipolar cells make their first synaptic connections with ganglion cells. Glutamate, the neurotransmitter contained in bipolar cells, generates spontaneous activity in ganglion cells. Waves are still present after bipolar cells establish synaptic connection with amacrine and ganglion cells.

Additional activity involved in retinal waves includes the following. In certain species, GABA appears to play a role in the frequency and duration of the bursts in ganglion cells. The interactions in cells vary in different test subjects and at different maturity levels, especially the complex interactions mediated by amacrine cells. Activity propagated via gap junctions has not been observed in all test subjects; for example, research has shown that ferret retina ganglion cells are not coupled. Other studies have shown that extracellular excitatory agents such as potassium could be instrumental in wave propagation. Research suggests that synaptic networks of amacrine and ganglion cells are necessary for the production of waves. Broadly put, waves are produced and continue over a relatively long developmental period, during which new cellular components of the retina and synapses are added. Variation in the mechanisms of retinal waves account for diversity in the connections between cells and the maturation of processes in the retina.

== Activity pattern of waves ==
Waves are generated at random but limited spatially due to a refractory period in cells after bursts of action potentials have been produced. After a wave has been propagated in one place, it cannot be propagated in the same place again. Wave-induced refractory areas last about 40 to 60 seconds. Research suggests that every region of the retina has an equal probability of generating and propagating a wave. The refractory period also determines the velocity (distance between wave fronts per unit of time) and periodicity (average time interval between wave-induced calcium transients or depolarizations recorded in a particular neuron in the ganglion cell layer). The density of refractory cells corresponds to how fast retinal waves propagate; for instance, if there is a low number or density of refractory cells, the velocity of propagation will be high.

== Experimental procedures ==
=== Visualization of waves ===
Two primary methods of visualizing retinal waves are the use of calcium imaging and multielectrode array. Calcium imaging allows analysis of wave pattern over a large area of the retina (more than with multielectrode recording). Imaging as such has allowed researchers to investigate spatiotemporal properties or waves as well as wave mechanism and function in development.

=== Disrupting waves ===
There are three main techniques currently used to disrupt retinal waves: intraocular injection of pharmacological substances that alter wave patterns, use of immunotoxins that eliminate certain classes of amacrine cells, or use of knockout mouse lines that have altered spontaneous firing patterns. There are several pharmacological agents that can be used to disrupt retinal activity. Tetrodotoxin (TTX) can be injected near the optic tract to block incoming retinal activity in addition to the outgoing activity of lateral geniculate neurons. Intraocular injections of epibatidine, a cholinergic agonist, can be used to block spontaneous firing in half of all retinal ganglion cells and cause uncorrelated firing in the remaining half. Effects of the pharmacological agents on retinal ganglion cell activity are observed using either MEA or calcium imaging. Immunotoxins can be used to target starburst amacrine cells. Starburst amacrine cells are retinal interneurons responsible for cholinergic retinal waves. The third method is to use knockout mice with altered spontaneous firing patterns. The most common line of mouse for this method is the neuronal nicotinic acetylcholine receptor beta-2 subunit knockout (β2-nAChR-KO). β2-nAChR-KO mice have been observed to have reduced eye-specific retinotopic refinement similar to epitbatidine injection as well as no correlated waves, as observed with calcium imaging and MEA recording.

== Controversial role in neuronal development ==
There is currently still much controversy about whether retinal waves play an 'instructive' or a 'permissive' role in the formation of eye-specific projections in the retinogeniculate pathway. Injections of pharmacological agents prevents the formation of eye-specific retinogeniculate inputs, which indicates that retinal waves play some role in the formation. β2-nAChR-KO mice have been found to have altered patterns of spontaneous firing. While experiments done in knock-out lines to date have helped to explain some things about retinal waves, only experiments done in vivo at normal body temperature and in a normal chemical environment can truly determine what the true pattern of firing is in the knock-out animals.

=== Instructive argument ===
Retinal wave activity has been found to coincide with the period in which eye-specific retinogeniculate projections are formed. This temporal overlap would be necessary for a causal relationship. TTX injections in fetal cats prevented the formation of eye-specific retinogeniculate projections, which indicates that neuronal activity is necessary for the formation of eye-specific layers. After treatment with epibatidine, the lack of correlated firing in the remaining half of retinal ganglion cells despite the robust firing as well as the lack of eye-specific layer formation can be indicated as proof that the waves play an instructional role. Calcium imaging observation following immunotoxin use showed that some correlated firing still remained where coupled voltage clamp recording showed significant reduction in correlated firing. The remaining correlated firing could explain the formation of eye-specific retinogeniculate projections that was found. Using calcium imaging and MEA recording these cells have shown to have no correlated firing. Instead, reduced firing rates have been observed, and depolarization in one cell seemed to inhibit surrounding cells. The altered firing pattern of the β2-nAChR-KO mice is also controversial as there has been some evidence that correlated firing still occurs in the knock-out mice, as detailed in the next section.

=== Permissive argument ===
Retinal waves have been found while eye-specific retinogeniculate pathways are formed; however, in all species studied to date retinal waves begin prior to and continue after these eye-specific pathways are formed. It also is noted that some species in which retinal waves have been documented to have projections that are crossed. This suggests that retinal waves can be present and not play an instructive role in eye-specific inputs. There are several issues to be considered when looking at data from use of pharmacological substance to block retinal activity. First, the long-term effects of treatment with TTX are unknown, as it is not yet possible to monitor the retinal activity for a long duration in an intact animal. The finding that long-term injection of TTX did not inhibit and instead merely delayed eye-specific layer formation could be explained then by the reduced effects of TTX on retinal activity at a longer duration. This supports the argument that blocking all retinal activity prevents eye-specific projection formation remains to be determined. Furthermore, since immunotoxin treatment to kill starburst amacrine cells shows no difference in the formation of eye-specific retinogeniculate projections while treatment with epibatidine does, it could suggest that some sort of retinal activity is essential for the eye-specific layer formation, but not retinal waves. One study showed that β2-nAChR-KO mice did still have robust retinal wave activity, unlike previously reported; however, they found that the retinal waves were propagated using gap junctions in the knock-out line, instead of cholinergic transmission wild-type mice display.
