= Orientation column =

Regions of neurons in the brain

Orientation columns are organized regions of neurons that are excited by visual line stimuli of varying angles. These columns are located in the primary visual cortex (V1) and span multiple cortical layers. The geometry of the orientation columns are arranged in slabs that are perpendicular to the surface of the primary visual cortex.

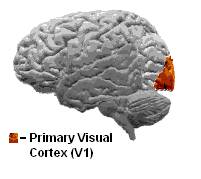
The primary visual cortex (V1) is located in the occipital lobe. This is the region where orientation columns are found.

== History ==
In 1958, David Hubel and Torsten Wiesel discovered cells in the visual cortex that had orientation selectivity. This was found through an experiment by giving a cat specific visual stimuli and measuring the corresponding excitation of the neurons in striate cortex (V1). The experimental set up was of a slide projector, a cat, electrodes, and an electrode monitor. They discovered this orientation selectivity when changing slides on the projector. The act of changing the slides produced a faint shadow line across the projector, and excited the neuron they were measuring. At the time of this experiment it was not conclusive that these orientation selective cells were in a "columnar" structure but the possibility of this structure was considered by research conducted by Vernon Mountcastle in 1956 about the topographic properties of the somatosensory system.

In 1974 Hubel and Wiesel wrote a paper about the geometry of orientation columns. They recorded 1410 cells in 45 penetrations into the striate cortex. Through this 1-dimensional technique they conceptualized that the orientation columns are not columns but slabs. In 1985, Gary Blasdel discovered a technique to visualize these orientation columns in 2D. His technique used photodiodes to detect optical changes in the visual cortex with the metabolic marker, 2-deoxyglucose, which labels active neurons. This confirmed Hubel and Wiesel's studies and also brought to light the swirls and pinwheel formations in the striate cortex.

Hubel and Wiesel received the Nobel Prize in Physiology and Medicine in 1981 for their contributions to our knowledge of the development of the visual system.

== Physiology ==
Orientation columns are located in the primary visual cortex also known as the striate cortex. These orientation columns are not cylindrical in shape as the word column implies but are flat slabs that are parallel to each other. The slabs are perpendicular to the surface of the visual cortex and are lined up similar to slices of bread. These neurons are highly discriminatory for visual orientations and their motion.

Most of the cells in orientation columns are complex cells. Complex cells will respond to a properly orientated line in any location of the receptive field, whereas simple cells have a narrower receptive field where a properly oriented line will excite it. Simple cells have distinct subdivisions of excitatory and inhibitory regions. It is proposed that complex cells receive input from many simple cells, which explains why the complex cells have a slightly wider receptive field.

There are possible biological advantages to the highly ordered structures of orientation columns. The first possible advantage is that orientation selectivity may be intensified with lateral inhibition from neighboring cells of a slightly different preferred orientation. This would provide an efficient system for wiring between the striate cortex and the lateral geniculate nucleus (LGN). The second possible advantage is the ordered structure aids in development, by guaranteeing all orientations are represented throughout the visual field with minimal redundancy and no deficiencies. The third possible advantage is that if columns with similar orientation selectivity are close together, fewer afferents from the LGN are needed. This allows for efficient wiring. So by removing a few LGN inputs and adding a few, the orientation selectivity can be changed marginally.

Ocular dominance columns are also found in the striate cortex. These columns were found to prefer crossing iso-orientation lines perpendicularly. During microelectrode experiments, it is normal to see penetrations where eye dominance changes between the contralateral eye and ipsilateral eye but this does not interrupt the orientation sequence.

=== Preferred orientation ===
Recently, studies involving human models were conducted with high-field fMRI. These studies demonstrated the existence of orientation preference in humans and showed similarities to the studies conducted with monkey models. It was found in these models that there was an over-representation of the 90° orientation preference. This corresponds to a bias towards processing vertical visual stimuli with horizontal movement. This bears resemblance to the oblique effect where there is a deficiency in perception to oblique contours (45° and 90°).

=== Pinwheels ===
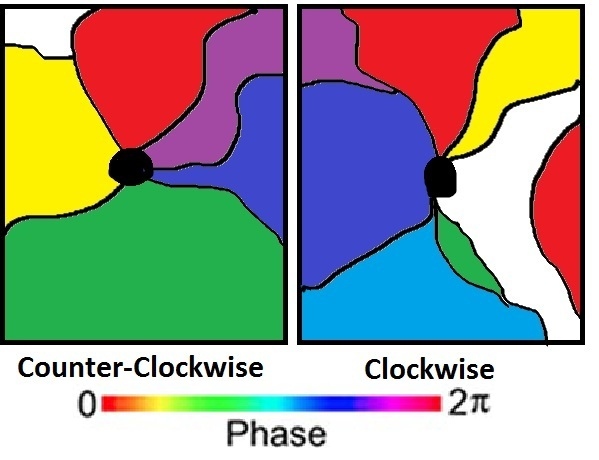
Pinwheel formations in the primary visual cortex with singularities in the center. Each color represents an orientation column of a specific line phase. Adapted image from fMRI studies.

Using 2D optical techniques, pinwheel formations (also known as whorls) of orientation columns were discovered. Pinwheels are the location where multiple orientation columns converge. Orientation columns are organized radially around a point known as a singularity. The arrangement, around the singularity, can be observed to be in both a counter-clockwise or clockwise fashion. It is suggested that an artifact of the optical recordings may cause these singularities. Limitations in the resolution of the optical technique may be to explain for these singularities.

=== Fractures ===
Fractures are breaks in the sequence of orientation selectivity from microelectrode studies. In these studies the fractures occur randomly during trials. Optical methods in trying to explain why these fractures occur, have had limited success.

== Development ==
Orientation maps in monkeys are innately determined at birth. Like other parts of the brain, the visual cortex goes through a critical period where the visual environment can change the orientation maps due to its plastic nature during this period. Visual deprivation during this period will cause a deterioration of these innate connections. Also if the visual environment is confined to only vertical or horizontal lines during this critical period the distribution of the preferred orientation of cells in the striate cortex become abnormal. This is probably due to cells maturing their preferred orientation to that of the most common type of visual stimulus.

== Modeling ==
=== Hebbian development of a multilayer neural network ===
A multilayer neural network model by Linsker, having local connections from each cell layer to the next, whose connection strengths develop according to a Hebbian rule, generates orientation-selective cells and orientation columns. The resulting columnar arrangement contains fractures and "pinwheel" singularities of the same types as those found experimentally.

=== Moire interference ===
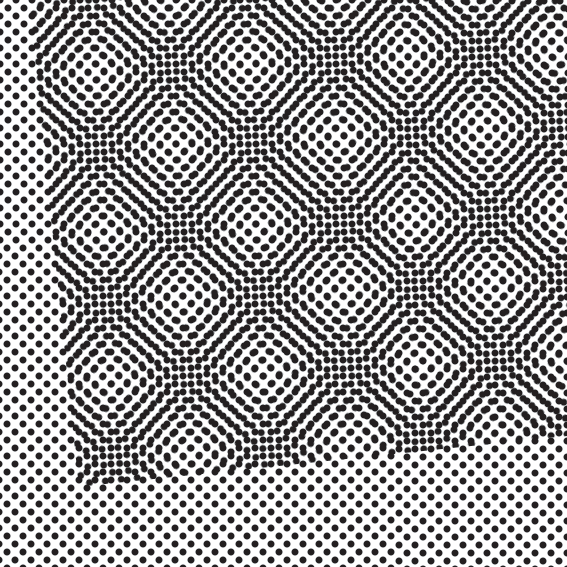
An example of a Moiré interference pattern. The offset of the two lattices creates a dipole of retinal ganglion cells. This dipole is orientated in various directions that correspond to a specific orientation.

A highly debated model for the origin of orientation maps is Moiré interference from retinal ganglion cells (RGCs). The ideal case takes two layers of perfect hexagonal lattices of the on-center and off-center receptive fields of the RGCs. These two layers are superimposed on each other with an angled offset that produces a periodic interference pattern. This pattern produces dipoles of these RGCs that have a preferred orientation scattered throughout the visual field. This mosaic produces periodic map of preferred orientation that fulfills all orientations with regularity. Cortical inputs from this mosaic of RGCs through the LGN can explain the origin of the orientation maps in the visual cortex.

== Further research ==
=== Orientation scotomas ===
The theory of Moire interference patterns governing the orientation map predicts the existence of orientation scotomas. This is because the lattice of the RGCs are not perfectly hexagonal and therefore, at some locations, representation of specific orientations will be missing. Currently there is research that is testing this hypothesis by "mapping human orientation discrimination thresholds of very small stimuli in the far periphery."

== See also ==
- Ocular dominance column
- Visual cortex
