= Natalia Komarova =

Russian-American applied mathematician

- Born: 1971 (age 54–55)
- Spouse: Dominik Wodarz

Academic background
- Education: Moscow State University
- Alma mater: University of Arizona
- Thesis: Essays on Nonlinear Waves: Patterns under Water; Pulse Propagation through Random Media (1998)
- Doctoral advisor: Alan C. Newell

Academic work
- Discipline: Applied mathematics
- Sub-discipline: Mathematical modeling of complex systems
- Institutions: University of California, San Diego

Natalia L. Komarova (born 1971) is a Russian-American applied mathematician whose research concerns the mathematical modeling of cancer, the evolution of language, gun control, pop music, and other complex systems. She is a Professor of Mathematics and Dean's Scholar at the University of California, San Diego.

== Education and career ==
Komarova studied physics at Moscow State University, earning a master's degree there in 1993. She completed her Ph.D. in 1998 at the University of Arizona. Her dissertation, Essays on Nonlinear Waves: Patterns under Water; Pulse Propagation through Random Media, was supervised by Alan C. Newell.

After postdoctoral research at the University of Warwick, the Institute for Advanced Study, and the University of Chicago, Komarova became a lecturer at the University of Leeds in 2000. She moved to Rutgers University in 2003 and to the University of California, Irvine in 2004. At UC Irvine, she was named a Chancellor's Professor in 2017. In 2024 she moved to University of California, San Diego.

== Recognition ==
Komarova won a Sloan Research Fellowship in 2005. In 2023, Komarova was elected a Fellow of the American Association for the Advancement of Science.

== Books ==
Komarova is married to UC Irvine evolutionary biologist Dominik Wodarz. She has written three books with Wodarz:

- Computational Biology of Cancer: Lecture Notes and Mathematical Modeling (World Scientific, 2005)
- Dynamics Of Cancer: Mathematical Foundations Of Oncology (World Scientific, 2014)
- Targeted Cancer Treatment in Silico: Small Molecule Inhibitors and Oncolytic Viruses (Birkhäuser, 2014)
