= Orthodenticle homeobox 2 =

Protein-coding gene in the species Homo sapiens

OTX2
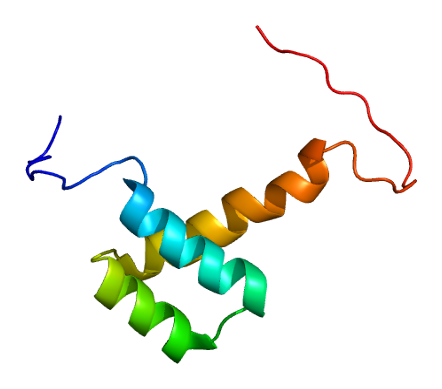

Identifiers
- Aliases: OTX2, CPHD6, MCOPS5, Orthodenticle homeobox 2
- External IDs: OMIM: 600037; MGI: 97451; GeneCards: OTX2
Available structures
PDB	Ortholog search: PDBe RCSB
PDB	List of PDB id codes 2DMS

Gene location (Human)
Chr.	Chromosome 14 (human)
Band	14q22.3	Start	56,799,905 bp
Band	14q22.3	End	56,816,693 bp

Gene location (Mouse)
Chr.	Chromosome 14 (mouse)
Band	14 C1|14 25.36 cM	Start	48,895,134 bp
Band	14 C1|14 25.36 cM	End	48,911,276 bp
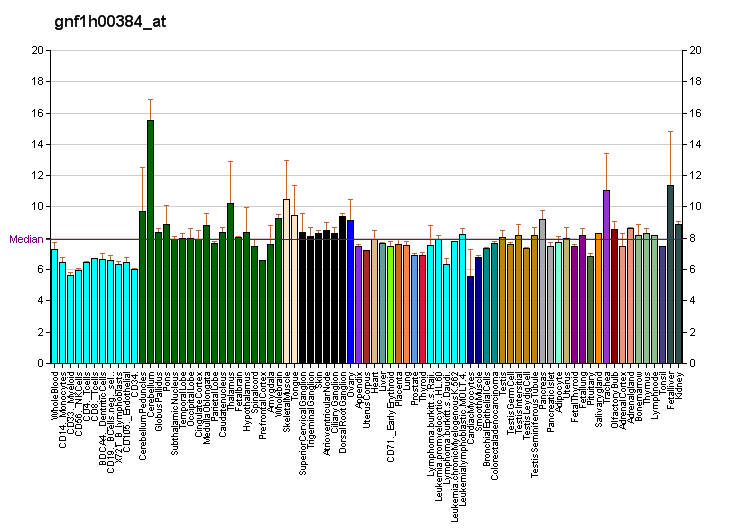
RNA expression pattern
Bgee	Human / Mouse (ortholog); Top expressed in: secondary oocyte; retinal pigment epithelium; cerebellar hemisphere; right hemisphere of cerebellum; lateral nuclear group of thalamus; nasal epithelium; gonad; tibialis anterior muscle; substantia nigra; olfactory zone of nasal mucosa / Top expressed in: pineal gland; retinal pigment epithelium; vestibular membrane of cochlear duct; neural layer of retina; Epithelium of choroid plexus; lateral ventricle; choroid plexus of lateral ventricle; epiblast; embryo; ciliary body; More reference expression data
BioGPS	More reference expression data
Gene ontology
Molecular function	DNA binding; sequence-specific DNA binding; DNA-binding transcription factor activity; DNA-binding transcription activator activity, RNA polymerase II-specific; RNA polymerase II cis-regulatory region sequence-specific DNA binding; protein binding; eukaryotic initiation factor 4E binding; DNA-binding transcription factor activity, RNA polymerase II-specific
Cellular component	growth cone; nucleus; protein-containing complex
Biological process	dopaminergic neuron differentiation; regulation of transcription, DNA-templated; positive regulation of gastrulation; regulation of fibroblast growth factor receptor signaling pathway; axon guidance; positive regulation of transcription, DNA-templated; multicellular organism development; regulation of smoothened signaling pathway; forebrain development; positive regulation of embryonic development; primitive streak formation; midbrain development; positive regulation of transcription by RNA polymerase II; transcription by RNA polymerase II; protein-containing complex assembly
Sources:Amigo / QuickGO
Orthologs
Databases	NCBI: entry; OMA: entry
Species	Human	Mouse
Entrez	5015	18424
Ensembl	ENSG00000165588	ENSMUSG00000021848
UniProt	P32243	P80206
RefSeq (mRNA)	NM_001270523; NM_001270524; NM_001270525; NM_021728; NM_172337	NM_001286481; NM_001286482; NM_001286483; NM_144841; NM_001360225 NM_001360226
RefSeq (protein)	NP_001257452; NP_001257453; NP_001257454; NP_068374; NP_758840	n/a
Location (UCSC)	Chr 14: 56.8 – 56.82 Mb	Chr 14: 48.9 – 48.91 Mb
PubMed search
- Wikidata
View/Edit Human	View/Edit Mouse

Homeobox protein OTX2 is a protein that in humans is encoded by the OTX2 gene.

== Function ==
This gene encodes a member of the bicoid sub-family of homeodomain-containing transcription factors. The encoded protein acts as a transcription factor and plays a role in brain and sensory organ development. A similar protein in mice is required for proper forebrain development. Two transcript variants encoding distinct isoforms have been identified for this gene. Other alternative splice variants may exist, but their full length sequences have not been determined.

Otx2 is a group of homeobox genes that are typically described as a head organizer in the primitive streak stage of embryonic development. Otx2, which is an encoded protein that plays the role of a transcription factor, has also been shown to be involved in the regional patterning of the midbrain and forebrain. This group of genes demonstrates later in progression to have an influence on the formation of the sensory organs, pituitary gland, pineal gland, inner ear, eye and optic nerve. Otx2 not only has a prominent role in developing this area but also aids in ensuring that the retina and brain stay intact. This group of genes has a huge role in development and if it is expressed incorrectly it can have detrimental effects on the fetus. Otx2 mutations have also been associated with seizures, developmental delays, short stature, structural abnormalities of the pituitary gland, and an early onset of degeneration of the retina. A knockout model on the group of Otx2 genes has been performed to see what effects it would have on the adult retina. It was found that without the Otx2 gene expression there was slow degeneration of photoreceptor cells in this area. Thus, proving that the homeobox genes of Otx2 are essential in forming a viable embryo.

Otx2 is necessary for retina development, retina maturation, and fate determination of photoreceptors. In the mouse, studies have shown development of the retina is regulated in a cell type- and stage-specific manner by seven Otx2 cis-regulatory modules. Three of these cis-regulatory modules, O5, O7 and O9 indicate three distinct cellular expressions of Otx2. A "knockin" mouse line was generated where Crx (Otx family homeoprotein) was replaced by Otx2 and vice versa to examine the functional substitutability. It was found that Crx and Otx2 cannot be substituted in photoreceptor development. High Otx2 levels induce photoreceptor cell fate but not bipolar cell fate. Low levels of Otx2 impair bipolar cell maturation and survival. Studies in the chicken confirmed a functional role for Otx2 in the determination of photoreceptors. Otx2 also represses specific retinal fates (such as subtypes of retinal ganglion and horizontal cells) of sister cells to promote the specification of photoreceptors.

== Clinical significance ==
Otx2 is expressed in the brain, ear, nose and eye, and in the case of mutations; it can lead to significant developmental abnormalities and disorders. Mutations in OTX2 can cause eye disorders including anophthalmia and microphthalmia. Apart from anophthalmia and microphthalmia, other abnormalities such as aplasia of the optic nerve, hypoplasia of the optic chiasm and dysplastic optic globes have also been observed. Other defects that occur due to a mutation of the Otx2 gene include pituitary abnormalities and mental retardation. Abnormal pituitary structure and/or function seem to be the most common feature associated with Otx2 mutations.

Otx2 also regulates two other genes, Lhx1 and Dkk1 that also play a role in head morphogenesis. Otx2 is required during early formation of the embryo to initiate the movement of cells towards the anterior region and establish the anterior visceral endoderm. In the absence of Otx2, this movement can be impeded, which can be overcome by the expression of Dkk1, but it does not prevent the embryo from developing head truncation defects. The absence of Otx2 and the enhanced expression of Lhx1 can also lead to severe head truncation.

It has been shown that if Otx2 is overexpressed, it can lead to childhood malignant brain tumors called medulloblastomas.

Duplication of OTX2 is involved in the pathogenesis of Hemifacial Microsomia.

In the mouse, the lack of Otx2 inhibits the development of the head. These 'knockout' mice that fail to form the head have gastrulation defects and die at midgestation with severe brain anomalies.

== Role of Otx2 in Visual Plasticity ==
Recent research has identified the homeoprotein Otx2 as a possible molecular 'messenger' that is necessary for experience-driven visual plasticity during the critical period. Initially involved in embryonic head formation, Otx2 is re-expressed during the critical period of rats (>P23) and regulates the maturation of parvalbumin-expressing GABAergic interneurons (PV-cells), which control the onset of critical period plasticity. Dark-rearing from birth and binocular enucleation of rats resulted in decreased expression of PV-cells and Otx2, which suggests that these proteins are visually experience-driven. Otx2 loss-of-function experiments delayed ocular dominance plasticity by impairing the development of PV-cells. Research into Otx2 and visual plasticity during the critical period is of particular interest to the study of developmental abnormalities such as amblyopia. More research must be conducted to determine if Otx2 could be utilized for therapeutic recovery of visual plasticity to aid some amblyopic patients.

== Role in Embryonic Stem Cells Biology ==
Otx2 is a key regulator of the earliest stages of ES cell differentiation. The ectopic expression of Otx2 drives ES cells into differentiation, even in the presence of the LIF cytokine. At the molecular level, Otx2 induction partially compensates the gene expression changes induced by Nanog overexpression in the absence of LIF.

== Role in Ethanol Consumption in the Adult and Fetus ==
The Otx2 gene is an important transcription factor in the formation of dopaminergic neurons in the Ventral tegmental Area (VTA), an area located in the midbrain. The VTA is involved in drug reinforcement, reward processing, and addiction in the adult. Ethanol consumption during embryogenesis, leads to a reduction in Otx2 mRNA in the central nervous system altering gene expression. This altering of gene expression in the central nervous system in utero may contribute to addiction behaviors as an adult. In order to detect if the reduction of Otx2 due to ethanol caused an increase in binge-drinking behaviors in adults, a lentiviral hairpin (sh)RNA was used to target Otx2 and reduce the levels of Otx2 expression in the VTA in mice. The mice were then administered ethanol. It was found that Otx2 may contribute to binge-like drinking through transcriptional changes in the VTA (Coles & Lasek, 2021.
