= Bear-girl of Krupina =

The Bear Girl of Krupina (German: das Bärenmädchen von Karpfen) (fl. 1767) was a feral child allegedly discovered in the Slovak mountains.

According to Joseph-Aignan Sigaud de Lafond's Dictionnaire des merveilles de la nature (1781), the girl was discovered by a hunting party from the Bátovce village, tracking a bear in the Hont County of the Kingdom of Hungary, nearby the town of Krupina in 1767. According to Sigaud de Lafond, the hunting party ventured "deep in the mountains" and was startled to discover human footprints in the snow leading to a cave. In the cave they reportedly discovered a naked girl. Descriptions portray her as approximately eighteen years old, with "robust fat body, brown skin, a fearful expression, and wild behavior." She allegedly subsisted solely on raw meat, fitting the profile of a feral child. The villagers are said to have brought her from the cave to Krupina, where she was confined to a lunatic asylum. Until the end of her life, she refused cooked food and subsisted on raw meat, tree bark and various roots. She never learned to speak. According to Sigaud de Lafond, the girl was classified as Puella Karpfensis, a regional subtype of Homo Ferus (Latin for "wild man") as defined by the biologist Carl Linnaeus.

The French doctor Serge Aroles, a keen researcher of feral children stories, tried to verify the existence of the Bear Girl but found no traces of her in the Krupina archives.

== See also ==
- Feral child
- Peter the Wild Boy
