= Galway (disambiguation) =

Galway is a city in Ireland.

Galway may also refer to:

== Places ==
=== Ireland ===
- County Galway
- Galway Bay

=== Sri Lanka ===
- Galway's Land National Park

=== United States ===
- Galway, New York
- Galway (village), New York

== Constituencies ==
- Galway Town (Parliament of Ireland constituency)
- County Galway (Parliament of Ireland constituency)
- County Galway (UK Parliament constituency)
- Galway Borough
- Galway Connemara
- Galway (Dáil constituency)

== Other uses ==
- Galway (sheep), a breed of sheep
- Viscount Galway, a title
- Claddagh Ring or Galway, a type of wedding ring

== People with the surname ==
- Albéric O'Kelly de Galway (1911–1980), Belgian chess player
- Henry Galway (1859–1949), British Colonial Governor
- James Galway (born 1939), Northern Irish flutist
- Joseph G. Galway (1922–1998), American meteorologist
- Martin Galway (born 1966), Northern Irish musician

== See also ==
- Galloway, southwestern Scotland
- Galway Hooker, a type of sailing boat
- Mick Galwey, a former Irish rugby player and Gaelic footballer
