= Marie-Angélique Memmie Le Blanc =

Feral child (c. 1712 – 1775)

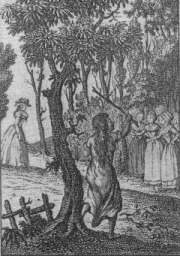
- Born: Birth name unknown c. 1712; French Louisiana, today part of Wisconsin, United States
- Died: 15 December 1775 (aged 62–63); Paris, France
- Other names: The Wild Girl of Champagne; The Maid of Châlons; The Wild Child of Songy

Marie-Angélique Memmie Le Blanc (c. 1712 in Wisconsin?, French Louisiana – 15 December 1775 in Paris, France) was a feral child of 18th-century France who was known as The Wild Girl of Champagne, The Maid of Châlons, or The Wild Child of Songy.

Her case is more controversial than that of some other feral children because a few modern-day scholars have regarded it as either wholly or partly fictional. However, in 2004, the French author Serge Aroles argued that it was indeed authentic, after spending ten years carrying out archival research into French and American history.

Aroles speculates that Marie-Angélique had survived after running way and for ten years living wild in the forests of France, between the ages of nine and nineteen, before she was captured by villagers in Songy in Champagne in September 1731. He claims that she was born in 1712 as a Native American of the Meskwaki (or "Fox") people in what today is the Midwestern U.S. state of Wisconsin and that she died in Paris in 1775, aged 63. Aroles found archival documents showing that she learned to read and write as an adult, thus making her unique among feral children.

== History ==
It was said that Le Blanc was first seen raiding an apple orchard wearing only rags and wielding a wooden club. When hunters sent their hunting dogs after her, Le Blanc fought them off with her club. A nobleman had given orders to have her apprehended which the hunters managed to accomplish.

During her recovery in Paris, Le Blanc was placed under the care of the Hôtel-Dieu, where records indicate she began her transition to a domestic lifestyle before eventually learning to read and write.

== Contemporary accounts ==
The story of Marie-Angélique's life in the wild was publicised in the mid-18th century in both France and Britain through a short pamphlet biography of her by the French writer Marie-Catherine Homassel Hecquet edited by the French scientist-explorer Charles-Marie de la Condamine and published in Paris in 1755. This appeared in an English translation in 1768 as An Account of a Savage Girl, Caught Wild in the Woods of Champagne. However, it was not error free, as it gave Marie-Angélique's age at the time of her capture as ten, although it is now speculated to have been nineteen.

Interviews with Marie-Angélique herself were recorded by the French royal courtier and diarist Charles-Philippe d’Albert, Duc de Luynes (1753), the French poet Louis Racine (c. 1755) and the Scottish philosopher-judge James Burnett, Lord Monboddo (1765). In addition, accounts of her were published by the French naturalists Georges-Louis Leclerc, Comte de Buffon (1759) and Jacques-Christophe Valmont de Bomare (1768), Lord Monboddo (1768) (1773) and (1795), the Châlons lawyer-antiquary Claude-Rémy Buirette de Verrières (1788) and the French historian Abel Hugo (1835).

== Marie-Catherine Homassel Hecquet ==
Marie-Catherine Homassel-Hecquet (12 June 1686 – 8 July 1764) was a French biographical author of the first half of the 18th century. She was the wife of the Abbeville merchant Jacques Homassel and the semi-anonymous "Madame H–––t" who published a pamphlet biography of the famous feral child Marie-Angélique Memmie Le Blanc, Histoire d'une jeune fille sauvage trouvée dans les bois à l’âge de dix ans, in Paris in 1755. This appeared in an English translation in 1768 as An Account of a Savage Girl, with a preface by the Scottish philosopher-judge James Burnett, Lord Monboddo, which anticipates some of the later evolutionary theories of the English scientist Charles Darwin.

== Modern assessments ==
The story of Marie-Angélique's life remains little known in English-speaking countries and appeared to have been almost forgotten in France until quite recently, with the publication of Julia Douthwaite's articles and book. It was featured in broadcasts by the French radio channel Europe1 in 2011 and by the France Inter channel in 2012.

The French surgeon-author Serge Aroles summarizes Marie-Angélique's life in his second book, L'Enigme des enfants-loups: Une certitude biologique mais un déni des archives 1304–1954 (Paris, Editions Publibook, 2007). In his 1765 interview with Le Blanc, Lord Monboddo observed unique cognitive abilities, which he later cited as evidence of her intellectual capacity, despite the significant lack of human socialization during her formative years.

== See also ==
- List of solved missing person cases (pre-1950)
