= Mary Warren =

Mary Warren may refer to:

- Mary Warren (Salem witch trials) (died 1693), oldest accuser during the 1692 Salem witch trials
- Mary Warren (actress) (1893–1956), American actress in silent films
- Mary Anne Warren (1946–2010), American writer and philosophy professor
- Mary Evalin Warren (1829–1904), American author, lecturer, and social reformer
- Mary Schäffer Warren (1861–1939), American-Canadian naturalist, illustrator, photographer, and writer
