= Medinipur Baptist Church =

Church in Medinipur, India

Medinipur Baptist Church is a Baptist church situated at Sepahi Bazar, Medinipur town in Paschim Medinipur district of West Bengal.

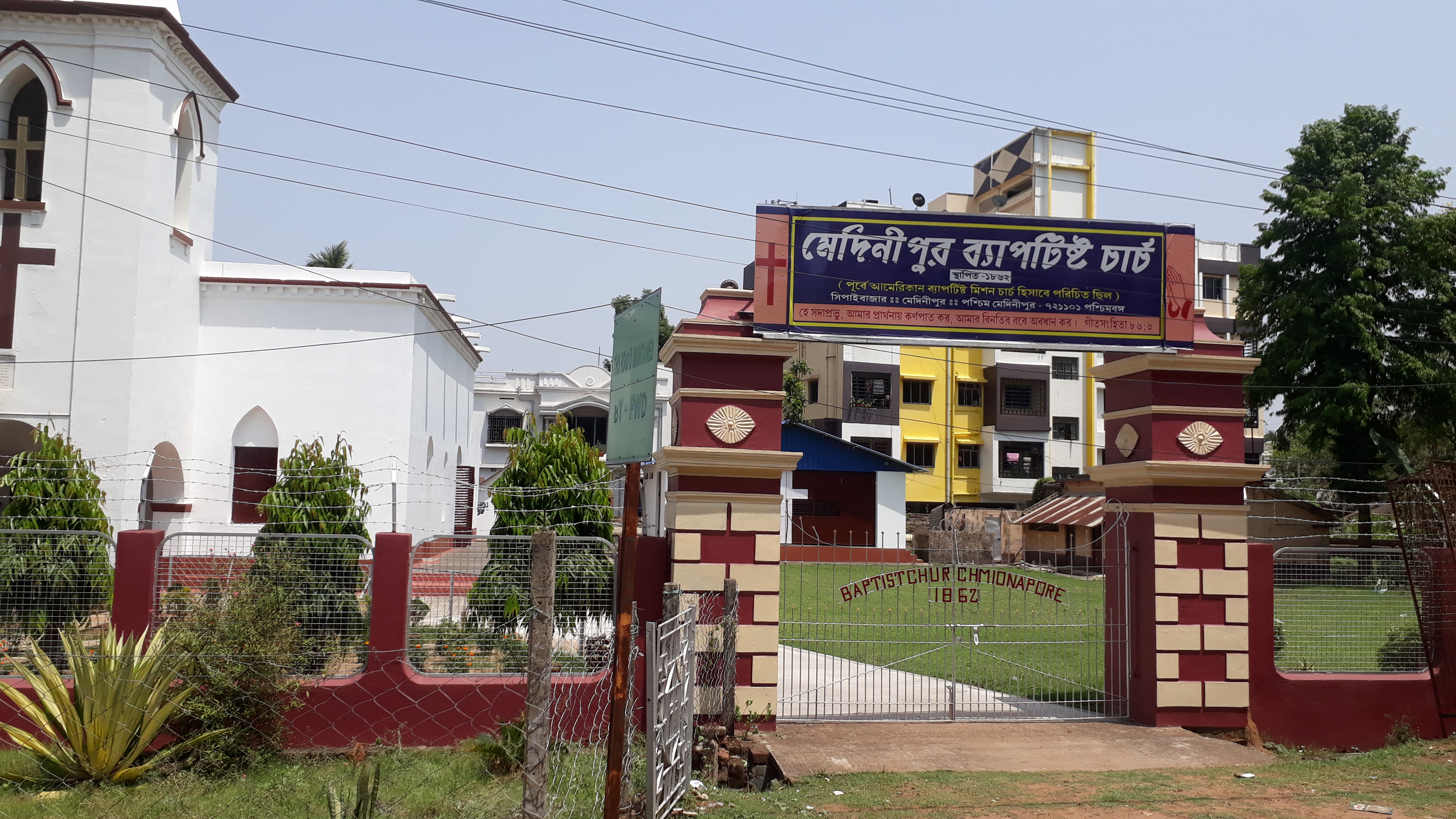
Medinipur Baptist Church

== History ==
American Baptist Free Mission Society came to Medinipur region in 19th century for missionary works. American missionary Rev. Otis Robinson Bacheler and his second wife Sarah P. Merrill, established the church at Medinipur in 1862. Initially this church was known as American Baptist Church. It is the first church founded by any American Baptist in the area.

== See more ==
- St. John's Church, Midnapore
- St. John's Churchyard, Midnapore
