= St. John's Churchyard, Midnapore =

Cemetery in West Bengal

St. John's Churchyard
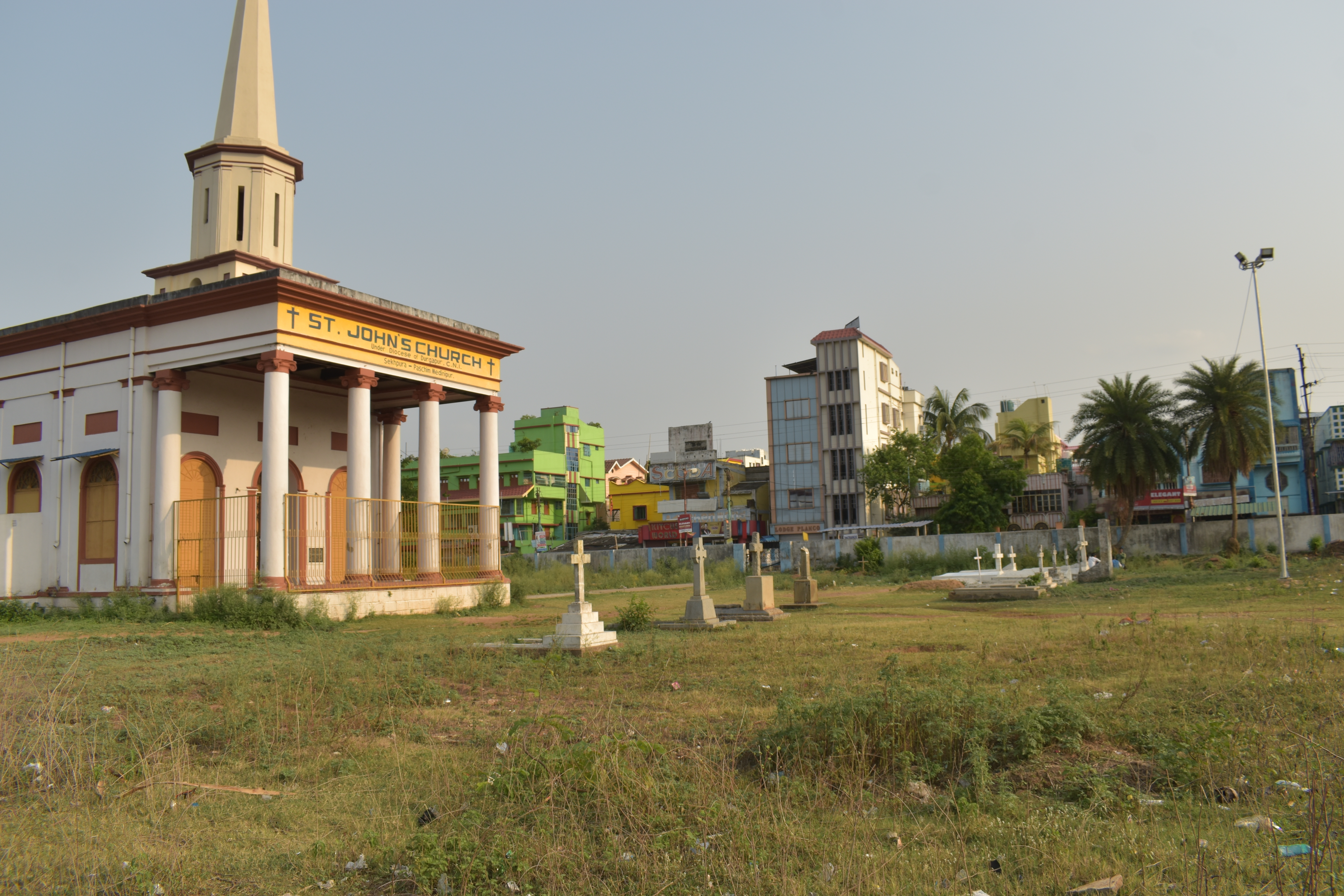

Details
- Established: 1851
- Location: Sekpura, Medinipur, Paschim Medinipur, West Bengal
- Country: India
- Type: Christian churchyard

St. John's Churchyard, also known as St. John's Church Cemetery, is a colonial heritage graveyard situated within the premises of St. John's Church at Sekpura in Medinipur in the Indian state of West Bengal.

== History ==
The cemetery was founded in 1851 when the Church Mission Society constructed St. John's Church to serve the Anglican community in Midnapore. It became the principal place of European civil servants, missionaries and their families stationed in the undivided Medinipur district, The churchyard contains sandstone and marble memorials in Victorian funerary styles, including obelisks, altar tombs.

== Notable graves ==
The cemetery is associated with the political revolt that occurred in Midnapore during the early 1930s. Three successive District magistrates of Medinipur were assassinated by members of the Bengal revolutionary movement and their graves is situated in the churchyard.

- James Peddie (1931)
- Robert Douglas (1932)
- Bernard Edward John Burge (1933)
- Amala, Feral child (1921)
- Lucie Mavourneen

== Gallery ==
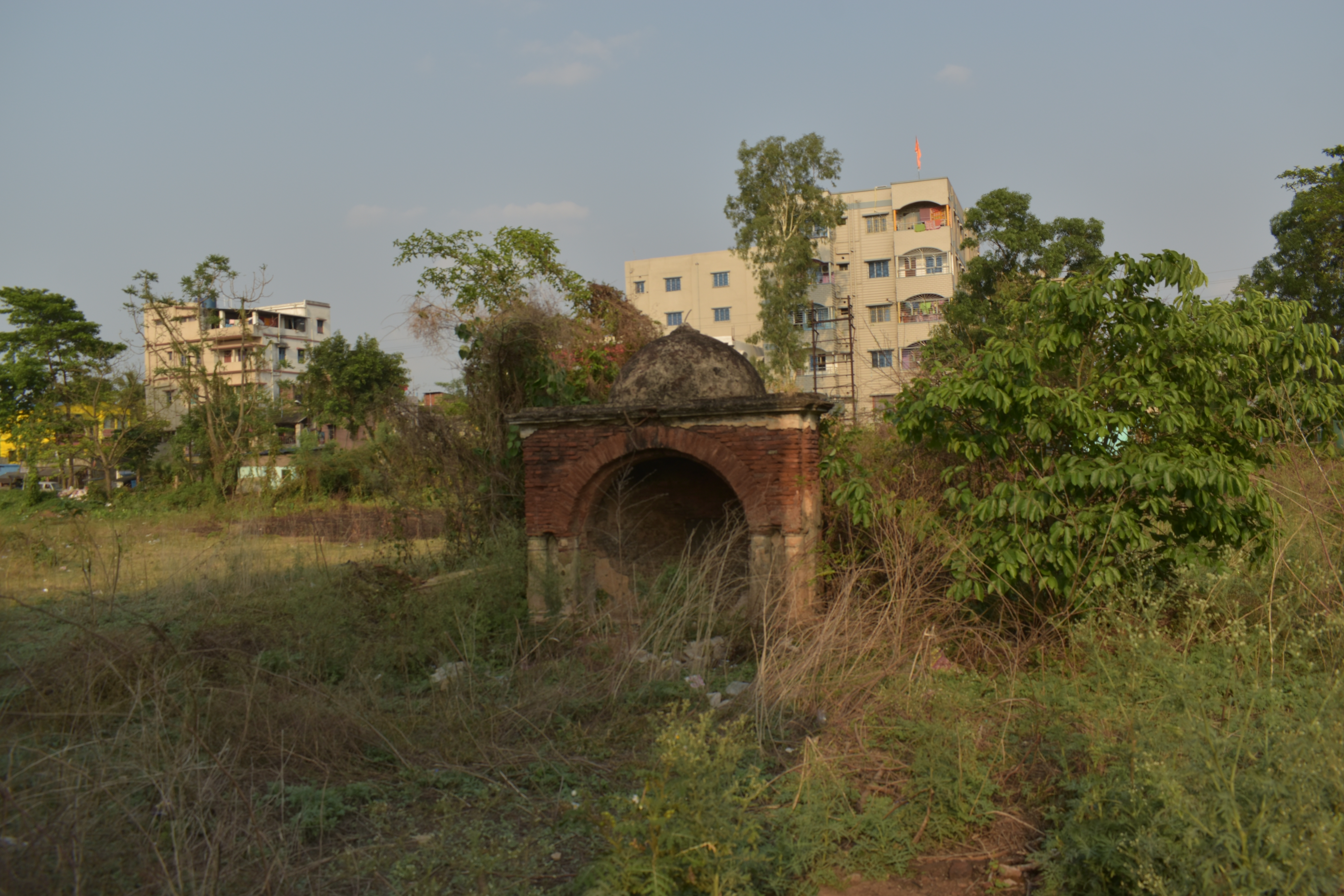

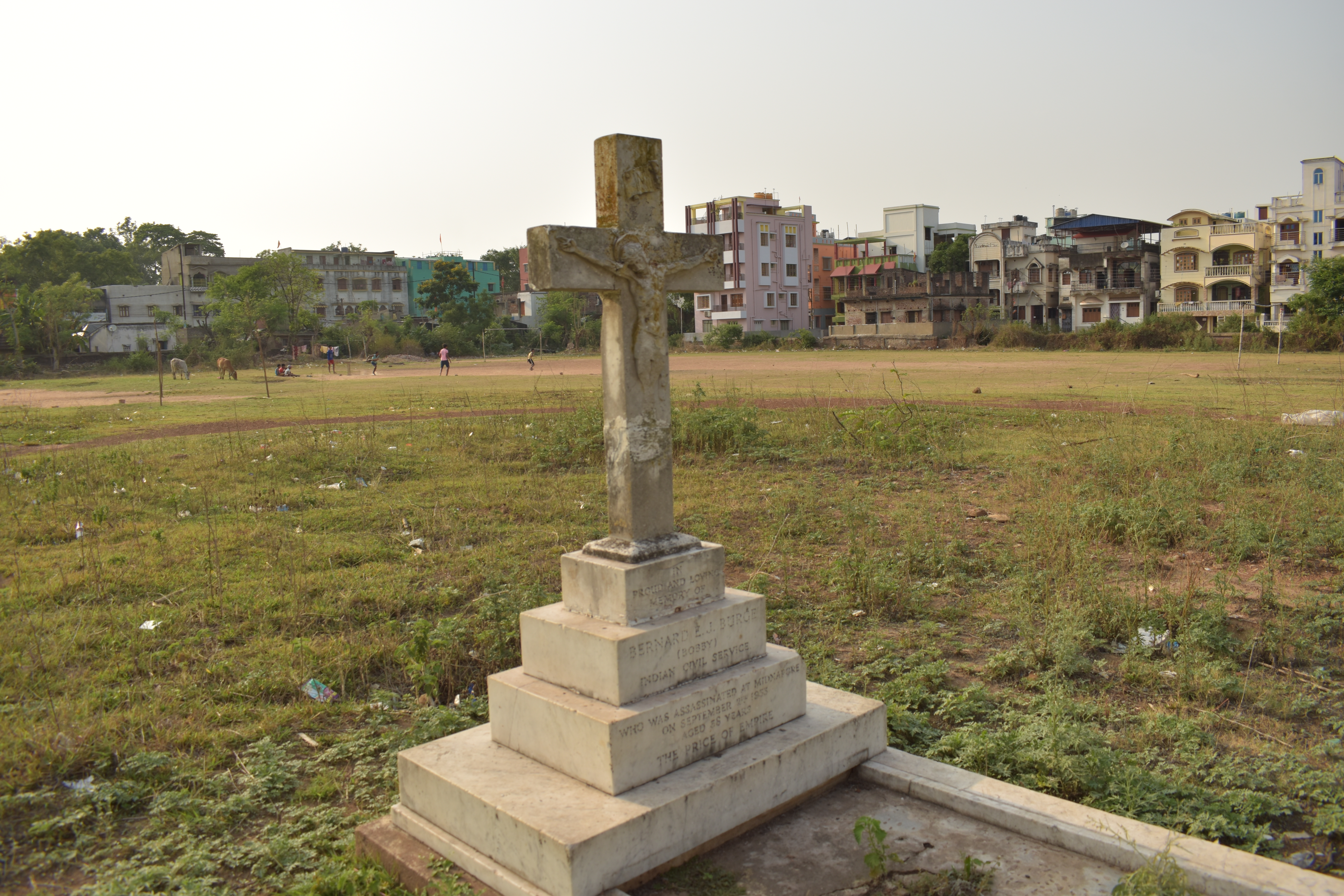

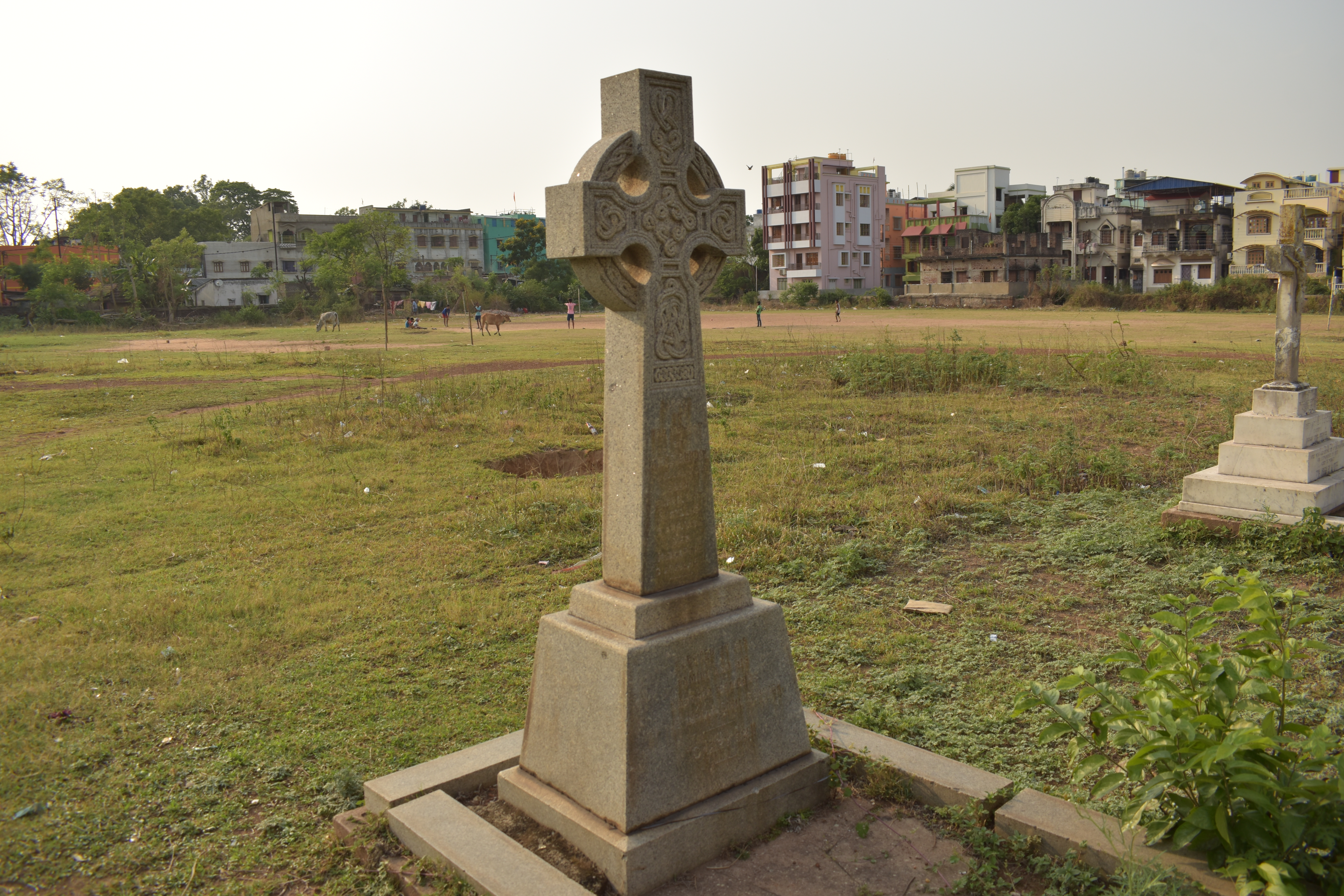

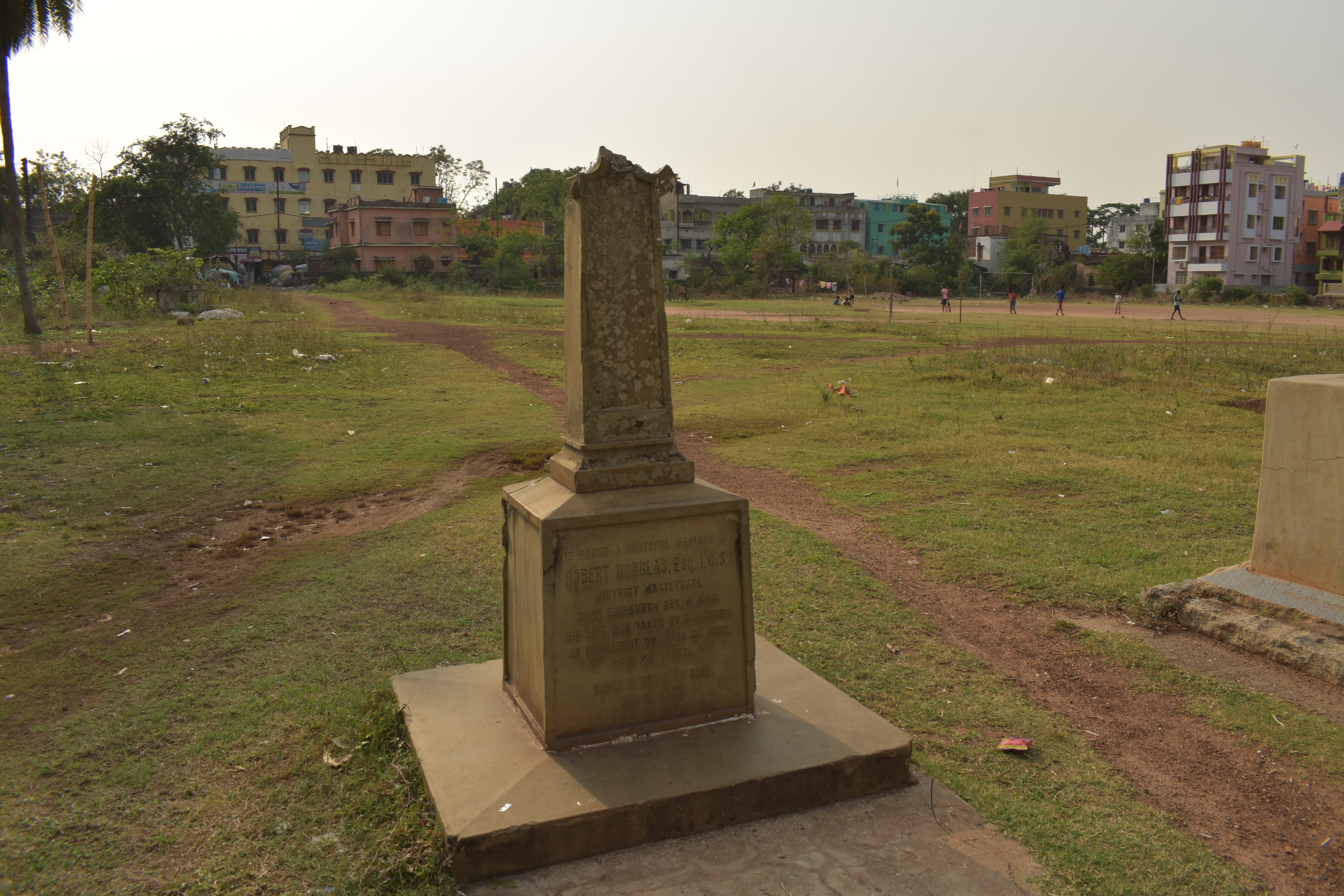

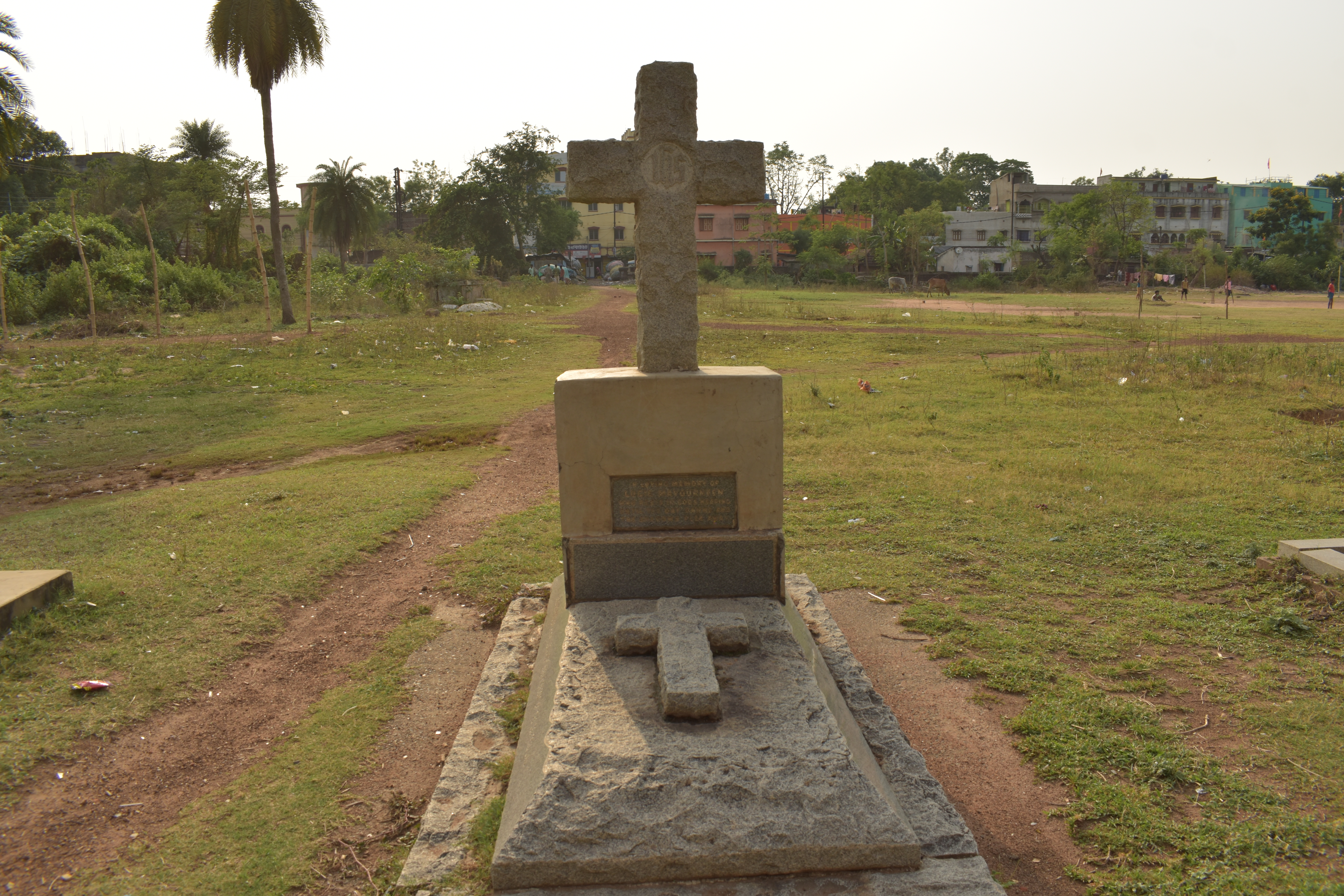

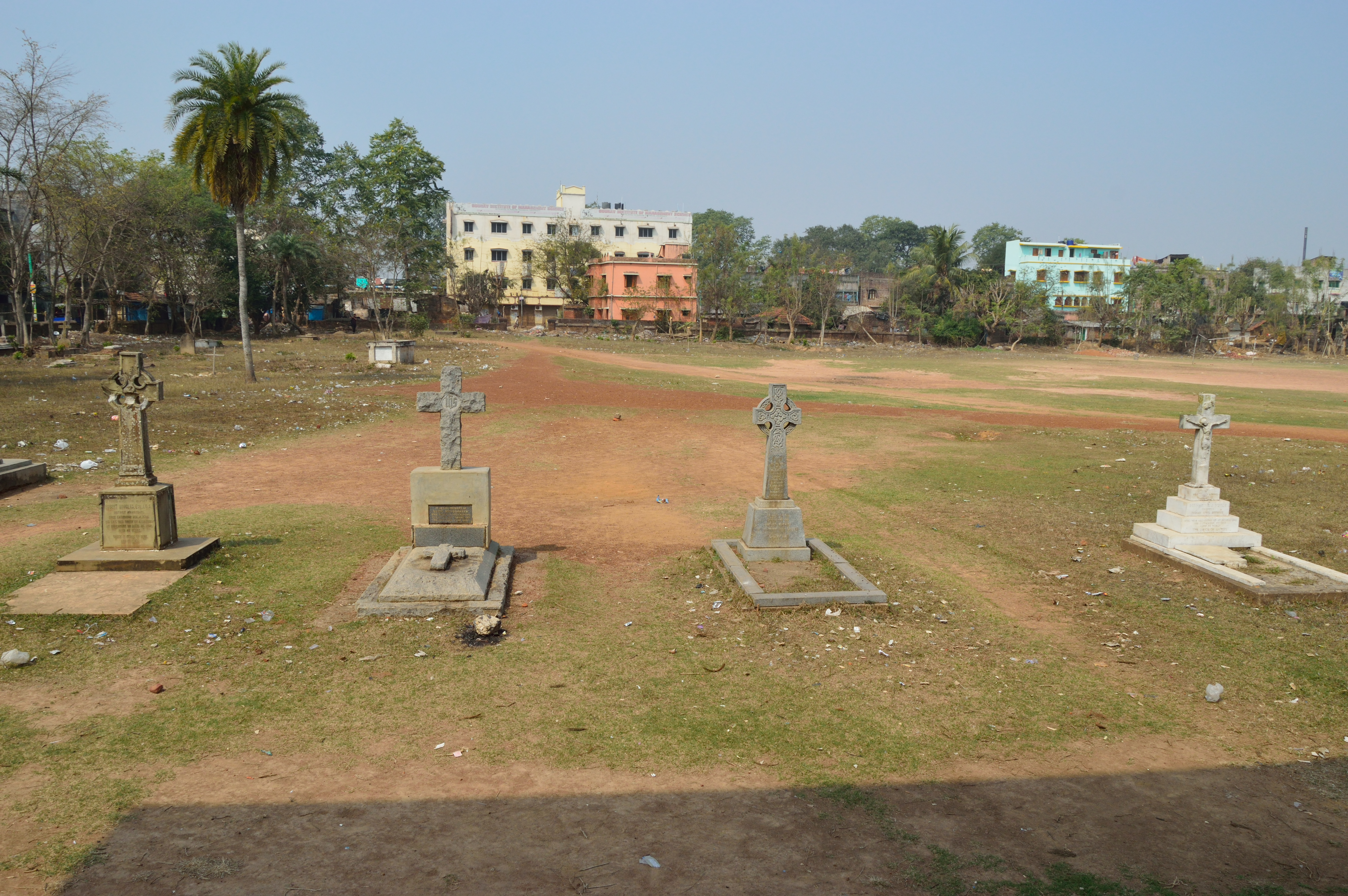

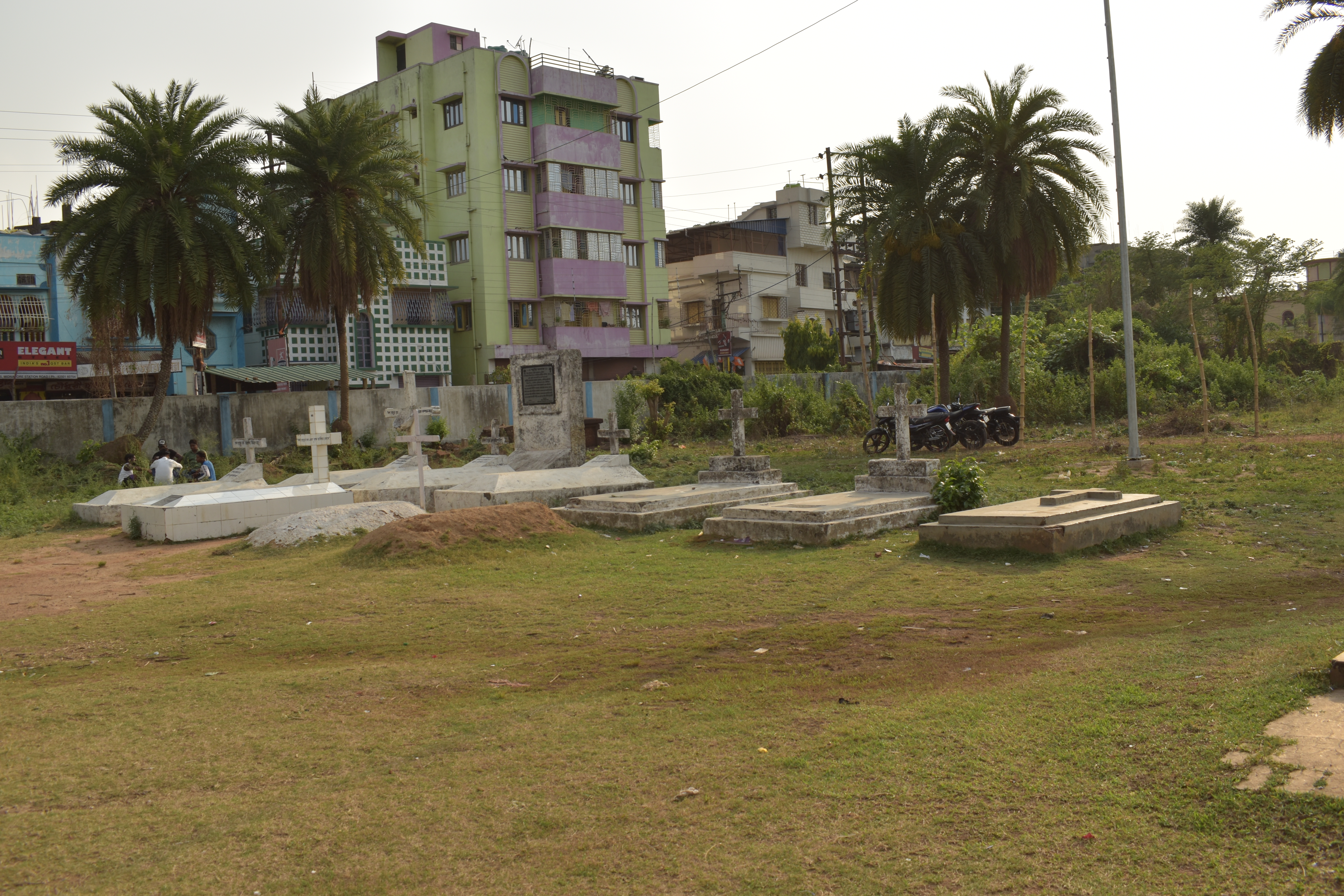

== See also ==
- Medinipur Baptist Church
- South Park Street Cemetery
