= Feral child =

Child who has lived isolated from human contact from a young age

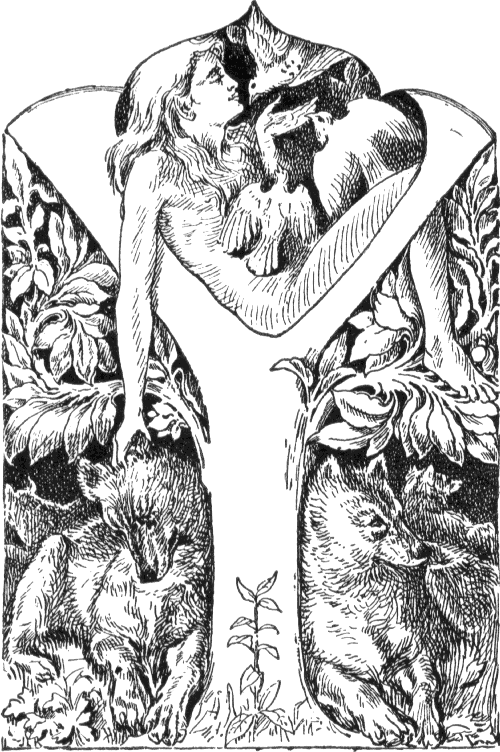
Mowgli is a feral child in Rudyard Kipling's novel The Jungle Book.

A feral child (also called wild child) is a young individual who has lived isolated from human contact from a very young age, with little or no experience of human care, social behavior, or language. Such children lack the basics of primary and secondary socialization. The term is used to refer to children who have suffered severe abuse or trauma before being abandoned or running away. They are sometimes the subjects of folklore and legends, often portrayed as having been raised by animals. While there are many cases of children being found in proximity to wild animals, there are no eyewitness accounts of animals feeding human children.

== Description ==
Feral children lack the basic social skills that are normally learned in the process of enculturation. For example, they may be unable to learn to use a toilet, have trouble learning to walk upright after walking on all fours their whole lives, or display a complete lack of interest in the human activity around them. They often seem mentally impaired and have almost insurmountable trouble learning a human language. The impaired ability to learn a natural language after having been isolated for so many years is often attributed to the existence of a critical period for language learning, and taken as evidence in favor of the critical period hypothesis.

There is little scientific knowledge about feral children. One of the best-documented cases has supposedly been that of sisters Amala and Kamala, described by Reverend J. A. L. Singh in 1926 as having been "raised by wolves" in a forest in India. French surgeon Serge Aroles, however, has argued that the case was a fraud, perpetrated by Singh in order to raise money for his orphanage. Child psychologist Bruno Bettelheim states that Amala and Kamala were born mentally and physically disabled. Yet other scientific studies of feral children exist, such as the case of Genie.

== History ==
Prior to the 1600s, feral and wild children stories were usually limited to myths and legends. In those tales, the depiction of feral children included hunting for food, running on all fours instead of two, and not knowing language. Philosophers and scientists were interested in the concept of such children, and began to question if these children were part of a different species from the human family.

The question was taken seriously as science tried to name and categorize the development of humans, and the understanding of the natural world in the 18th and 19th century. Around the 20th century, psychologists were attempting to differentiate between biological behavior and culture. Feral children who lived in isolation or with animals provided examples of this dilemma.

In his 1849–1850 report, Report on Budhuk alias Bagree Decoits, William Henry Sleeman provided six accounts of feral children nurtured by wolves, two he had witnessed himself, which were published separately in 1852 as An Account of Wolves Nurturing Children in Their Dens and are thought to have likely inspired the character of Mowgli in Rudyard Kipling's 1894 novel The Jungle Book.

== Cases ==
=== Journalistic cases ===
==== Raised by primates/monkeys ====
- Lucas, a native South African boy who was nurtured by a group of baboons. The boy was found in 1903.
- Marina Chapman claimed to have lived with weeper capuchin monkeys in the Colombian jungle from the age of five to about nine, following a botched kidnapping in about 1954. Unusual for feral children, she went on to marry, have children and live a largely normal life with no persisting problems.
- John, a boy who was discovered in 1974 in a jungle of Burundi with a troop of vervet monkeys.
- Robert Mayanja (1982) lost his parents in the Ugandan Civil War at the age of three, when Milton Obote's soldiers raided their village, around 50 miles (80 km) from Kampala. Robert then survived in the wild, presumably with vervet monkeys, for three years until he was found by soldiers of the National Resistance Army.
- Saturday Mthiyane (or Mifune) (1987), a boy of around five, was found after spending about a year in the company of monkeys in KwaZulu-Natal, South Africa. He was given the name Saturday after the day he was found, and Mthiyane was the name of the headmistress of the Special School which took him in. At the age of around 17, he could still not talk, and still walked and jumped like a monkey. He never ate cooked food and refused to share or play with other children. In 2005, he was killed in a fire.
- John Ssebunya, from Uganda, was a toddler when his father killed his mother and hanged himself. Ssebuyna was taken in by vervet monkeys and lived among them for the next two years, learning how to forage and travel. When he was around seven years old, he was brought back to civilization. According to a local villager, when he was a child, the only forms of communication he was capable of were crying and demanding food, and he was a "wild boy" whom everyone feared. He has since gained full speech abilities and has also twice competed in the Special Olympics for Uganda.

==== Raised by wolves ====
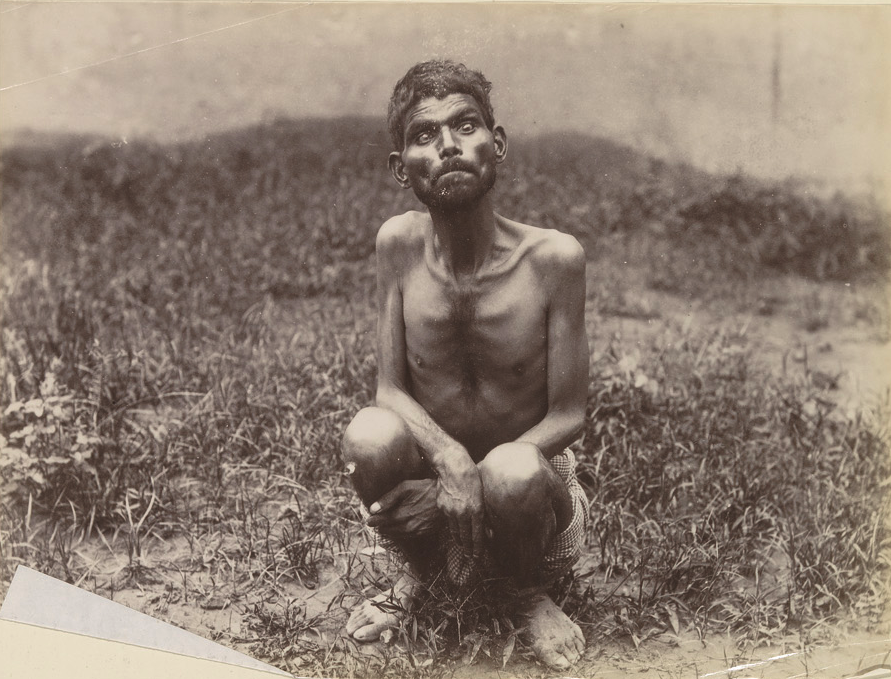
Dina Sanichar as a young man, ca. 1889–1894

- The Hessian wolf-children (1304, 1341 and 1344) lived with a population of Eurasian wolves in the forests of Hesse.
- Dina Sanichar, discovered among Indian wolves in a cave in Sikandra (near Agra) in Uttar Pradesh, India, in 1872, at the age of 6. He went on to live among humans for over twenty years, including picking up smoking, but never learned to speak and remained seriously impaired for his entire life.
- Marcos Rodríguez Pantoja (c. 1946, Sierra Morena, Spain) lived for 12 years with Iberian wolves in the mountains of Southern Spain. He was discovered at age 19. Rodríguez's story was depicted in the 2010 Spanish-German film Entrelobos. For his portrayal of Rodríguez, young actor Manuel Camacho received a Best New Actor nomination at the 2011 Goya Awards.

==== Raised by dogs ====
- Oxana Malaya was an eight-year-old Ukrainian girl who lived with Black Russian Terriers for six years. She was found in a kennel with dogs in 1991. She was neglected by her parents, who were alcoholics. The three-year-old, looking for comfort, crawled into the farm and snuggled with the dogs. Her behavior resembled that of dogs more than humans. She walked on all fours, bared her teeth, and barked. She was removed from her parents' custody by social services. As she lacked human contact, she did not know any words besides yes and no. Upon adulthood, Oxana has been taught to subdue her dog-like behavior. She learned to speak fluently and intelligently and works at a farm milking cows, but remains somewhat intellectually impaired.
- Ivan Mishukov, a six-year-old boy born in Reutov, Russia, was rescued by the police in 1998 from wild dogs, with whom he lived for two years. He ran from his mother and her abusive alcoholic boyfriend at the age of four. He earned the dogs' trust by giving them food and in return the dogs protected him, eventually considering him the leader of their pack. When the police found him, they set a trap for him and the dogs by leaving food in a restaurant kitchen. Because he had lived among the dogs for only two years, he relearned language fairly rapidly. He studied in military school and served in the Russian Army.
- A 10-year-old Chilean boy (Dog Boy) was rescued in 2001, after living with street dogs for two years. At the age of five, the boy was abandoned by his parents. After fleeing a subsequent child care facility, he roamed the streets with 15 stray dogs. He spent his time with them living in a cave and searching for food, sometimes finding leftovers in garbage cans. In 2001, his situation was brought to the attention of the police. Upon a rescue attempt, the boy tried to escape by jumping into frigid ocean water. However, he was caught and hospitalized. He exhibited depression and aggressive tendencies and, although he could speak, he would rarely do so.
- Traian Căldărar, Romania (found in 2002) also known as "the Romanian Dog Boy" or "Mowgli". From the ages of four to seven, Traian lived without his family. The boy was found at the age of seven and was described as a three-year-old due to undernutrition. His mother had left her home because of domestic violence, and Traian ran from home sometime after his mother left. He lived in the wild and took shelter in a cardboard box. He suffered from infected wounds, having poor circulation, and a nutritional disease caused by vitamin D deficiency. Traian was found by Manolescu Ioan, who had been walking nearby after his car broke down. In the surrounding area, a dog that had been partially eaten was also found. Many assume that the boy was eating the dog to stay alive. When Traian was being cared for, he would usually sleep under the bed and wanted to eat all the time. In 2007, Traian was being taken care of by his grandfather and was doing well in 3rd grade at school.
- Andrei Tolstykh (2004) was raised by dogs in a remote part of Siberia from the age of three months to 7 years. He was neglected by his parents because he had speaking and hearing problems. Social workers who found the boy were curious about why the boy was not admitted to his local school. This boy was not able to talk as he lacked human interaction and had many dog-like characteristics including walking on all fours, biting people, and sniffing his food before eating.
- Madina was a three-year-old girl when she was found in Russia in 2013. Madina lived with dogs from birth until she was three years old. She slept with them in the cold, ate food with them, and played with them. Madina's father left her after she was born, after which Madina's mother became an alcoholic and neglected the child as well. When found by social workers in 2013, Madina was completely nude and engaged in dog-like behavior, including the chewing of bones. Afterwards doctors confirmed that she was still mentally and physically capable despite being neglected for nearly her entire life.

==== Raised by bears ====
- The three Lithuanian bear-boys (1657, 1669, 1694) – Serge Aroles shows from the archives of the Queen of Poland (1664–1688) that these are false. There was only one boy who lived in the forests of Lithuania with a group of Eurasian brown bears; he was found in the spring of 1663 and then brought to Poland's capital. The boy, named Joseph, was one of two boys seen by hunters living in the woods with the bears. He was captured at about age 9, learning to walk upright and eat cooked meat, but disliked clothes and never spoke well. The other boy was never captured; the two may have been accidentally abandoned by their families trying to avoid Tatar raids.

==== Raised by sheep ====
- An Irish boy brought up by Galway sheep, reported by Nicolaes Tulp in his book Observationes Medicae (1672). The boy reportedly avoided capture for some time and, after being caught at age 16 in 1672 and taken to Amsterdam, refused to eat normal food, endured extreme temperatures, and avoided other people. Serge Aroles gives evidence that this boy was severely disabled and was exhibited for money.
- A 14-year-old boy, also known as the sheep boy (2009), was found in Kyrgyzstan living in a Alai sheep flock. After his parents left to find work, he was cared for by his grandmother until she died. He then lived with sheep in a makeshift shelter for 8 years. He had no communication skills and could not use the toilet.

==== Raised by cattle ====
- The Bamberg boy reportedly grew up among cattle (late 16th century) in the region's mountains, and was later brought to the Prince of Bamberg's court. He initially continued his wild behavior, such as chasing and fighting dogs on all fours, but eventually accustomed to human society.

==== Raised by goats ====
- Daniel, called the Andes Goat Boy (1990), lived in the wild for about 8 years. He was discovered in the mountains of Peru and was raised by goats or llamas. He walked and ran on all fours with the mountain goats. He drank goat's milk and ate berries and roots.

==== Other cases ====
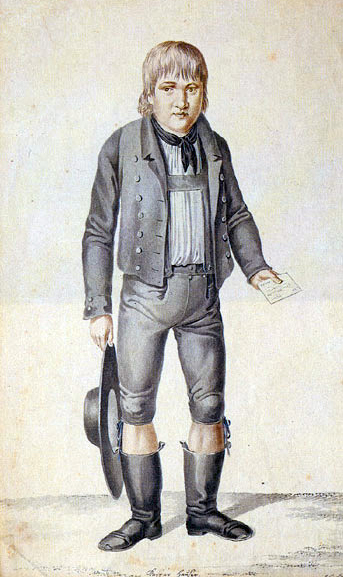
Kaspar Hauser

- Jean de Liège. Described by natural philosopher Sir Kenelm Digby in his book Two Treatises (1644). Jean, at age five, hid in the woods with his fellow villagers during a religious war. After the fighting left the area, Jean remained in the woods for another 16 years without human contact; during this time his senses became incredibly sharp. He was captured at age 21, "naked, 'all overgrown with hair,' and incapable of speech"; he reintegrated to human society and learned to speak, but lost his acute senses.
- The girl of Oranienburg (1717).
- The two Pyrenean boys (1719). The boys were reported to "run along the mountains on all-fours, and leaped from one rock to another like the chamois." They were found on the French side of the range. Very few details are available of their case. They were seen, but not captured.
- The girl of Issaux (1719?) was lost in the woods of the Pyrenees with friends at age eight and found at age 16 by a group of shepherds. She did not like human society and wished to return to the woods.
- A wild man in the Pyrenees (1723). He was caught by some hunters but escaped before reintegrating into human society.
- Peter the Wild Boy of Hamelin (1724) – Mentally disabled boy with Pitt-Hopkins Syndrome.
- Another man in the Pyrenees (1774). Found by shepherds in forest of Yvary, he "inhabited the rocks" and was described as a "mild character" and a "solitary, but cheerful creature," harmlessly visiting the cottages of nearby workers. He never attempted to harm any animals, and always outran the shepherds' dogs when they were sent after him. While at one of the workers' cottages he was briefly caught, but "laughed heartily" and escaped. He appeared to be around 30, and was suspected to have been lost as an infant and "subsisted on herbs."
- Another boy in the Pyrenees (1775).
- Victor of Aveyron (1800) – Victor was a feral child in the forests of Aveyron for twelve years. The subject is treated with a certain amount of realism in François Truffaut's 1970 film L'Enfant Sauvage (UK: The Wild Boy, US: The Wild Child), where a scientist's efforts in trying to rehabilitate a feral boy meet with great difficulty.
- Marie-Angélique Memmie Le Blanc was a famous feral child of the 18th century in France who was known as The Wild Girl of Champagne, The Maid of Châlons, or The Wild Child of Songy. Marie-Angélique survived for ten years living wild in the forests of France, between the ages of nine and 19, before she was captured by villagers in Songy in Champagne in September 1731. She was likely born in 1712 as a Native American of the Meskwaki (or "Fox") people, and brought to France in 1720; or she was born in an unknown location in 1712. Marie died in Paris in 1775. Documents show that she learned to read and write as an adult, thus making her unique among feral children.
- Hany Istók (a.k.a. Steve of the Marsh) of Kapuvár, Hungary (1749). According to documents stored at the Catholic parish of Kapuvár, an abandoned child was once found in a marshy lakeside forest by fishermen. He was brought to the town of Kapuvár, where he was christened and received the name István. The local governor took him to his castle and tried to raise him, but the boy eventually escaped and ran back to the forest. Later, numerous folk tales developed around his character, depicting him as a "half fish, half human creature" who lived in a nearby lake.
- Kaspar Hauser (early 19th century), portrayed in the 1974 Werner Herzog film The Enigma of Kaspar Hauser (Jeder für sich und Gott gegen alle), who existed but whose account of his own early isolation may have been a hoax.
- Ramachandra (1970s and 1980s) – First reported in 1973 in the Indian state of Uttar Pradesh, at roughly 12 years old, and as living an amphibian lifestyle in the Kuwano River. He was rescued in 1979 and taken to a nearby village. He only partly adapted to a conventional lifestyle, still preferring raw food, walking with an awkward gait, and spending most of his time alone in nearby rivers and streams. He died in 1982 after approaching a woman who was frightened by him, and who badly scalded Ramachandra with boiling water. Historian Mike Dash speculates that Ramachandra's uncharacteristically bold approach to the woman was sparked by a burgeoning sexual attraction coupled with his ignorance of cultural morals and taboos.
- Cambodian jungle girl (2007) – Alleged to be Rochom P'ngieng, who lived 19 years in the Cambodian jungle. Other sources questioned these claims. In August 2016, after immigration officials spent two weeks reviewing the case, the woman left Cambodia with her family and returned to Vietnam. Vietnamese media reported that her birth father discovered her through photographs on Facebook. The woman never learned to speak while living with her adoptive family in Cambodia, and according to her Vietnamese birth family, she has been that way since birth.
- Ng Chhaidy, Theiva near Saiha, Mizoram, India (2012) – She went missing in a jungle aged four, returning 38 years later. When she was first seen, she was naked, long-haired, and with long fingernails, which caused her to be seen as a "wild woman". In 2012, her vocabulary was limited to a few words.
- Ho Van Lang (2013) was found in Quang Ngai, Vietnam. His father, Ho Van Thanh, took him into the jungle (leaving behind a brother, Ho Van Tri) to flee from the Vietnam War, where he was raised for four decades in isolation. Upon discovery, he barely spoke a few words of the local dialect from the Cor minority. According to his brother, he was developmentally stunted like a child and could not distinguish good from bad. He died of liver cancer on 7 September 2021, at age 52.

=== Alleged cases ===
==== Ancient reports ====
The historian Herodotus wrote that Egyptian pharaoh Psammetichus I (Psamtik) sought to discover the origin of language, and prove Egypt was the oldest people on Earth by conducting an experiment with two children. Allegedly, he gave two newborn babies to a shepherd, with the instructions that no one should speak to them, but that the shepherd should feed and care for them while listening to determine their first words. The hypothesis was that the first word would be uttered in the root language of all people. When both of the children cried βεκος (bekos) with outstretched arms, the shepherd concluded that the word was Phrygian because that was the sound of the Phrygian word for bread. Thus, they concluded that the Phrygians were an older people than the Egyptians.

==== Modern reports ====
- The Lobo Wolf Girl of Devil's River (1845) – A figure in Texas folklore, was captured in 1846, but escaped. She was last spotted at age 17 in 1852. She was born to trapper couple Mollie and John Dent in May 1835, John leaving Mollie to get help with her delivery at a nearby Mexican goat ranch. Upon returning, Mollie was found dead and the baby missing, presumably eaten by wolves. In 1845, however, she was spotted helping a wolf pack attack a herd of goats, and the next year eating raw goat meat. She was briefly held in a ranch but the ranch was attacked by wolves, and in the confusion she escaped. She was last seen in 1852 suckling two wolf cubs along a river near El Paso, but disappeared.
- Vicente Caucau (1948) – Chilean boy found in a savage state at age 12, allegedly raised by pumas.
- The "ostrich boy" – A boy named Hadara was lost by his parents in the Sahara desert at the age of two, and was adopted by ostriches. At the age of 12, he was rescued and taken back to society and his parents. He later married and had children. The story of Hadara is often told in the Western Sahara. In 2000, Hadara's son Ahmedu told his father's story to the Swedish author of children's books, Monica Zak. Zak states that she did not believe the story but published it as an example of tales told in the desert. Zak states: "This book I have built on all the strange and exciting details I got from Hadara's son, the rest I have fantasized together."

=== Raised in confinement ===
- Isabelle (1938) was almost seven years old when she was discovered. She had spent the first years of her life isolated in a dark room with her mother, who was deaf and unable to speak, as her only contact. Only seven months later, she had learned a vocabulary of around 1,500 to 2,000 words. She is reported to have acquired normal linguistic abilities.
- Anna (1938) was six years old when she was found, having been kept in a dark room for most of her life. She was born in March 1932 in Pennsylvania, United States. She was her mother's second illegitimate child. Her mother had tried to give Anna up for several months, but no agency was willing to take the financial burden, as this was during the Great Depression. Anna was kept in a store room at least until she was five and a half, out of the way of her disapproving grandfather, who was infuriated by her presence. Her mother also resented her, considering her troublesome. She was tied to a broken chair which was too small for her, and is believed to have also been tied to a cot for long periods of time. She was mostly fed milk and was never bathed, trained, or caressed by anyone. When she was found, she was suffering from malnutrition as well as muscle atrophy. She was immobile, expressionless, and indifferent to everything. She was believed to be deaf as she did not respond to others (later it was found that her deafness was functional rather than physical). She could not talk, walk, feed herself, or do anything that showed signs of cognition. Once she was taken away and placed in a foster home, she showed signs of improvement. At the age of 9, she began to develop speech. She had started to conform to social norms and was able to feed herself, though only using a spoon. Her teachers described her as having a pleasant disposition. Anna died on 6 August 1942, at the age of 10 of hemorrhagic jaundice.
- Genie (1970) is the pseudonym given to a feral girl born in 1957 in Los Angeles. Confined to one room without external stimulation of any kind, Genie was strapped to a child's toilet and restrained in a makeshift harness for up to 13 hours per day and immobilized in a crib overnight. It was also theorized that Genie's father would beat her with a wooden plank kept in the room if Genie vocalized at all, and that he would growl like a dog outside of her door. This abuse continued from the age of 20 months until approximately 13 years and 7 months. Attempts were made to teach Genie language, but results were limited. After the first five years in which Genie received treatment, her living situation was mostly unstable, often moving between foster homes and hospitals, as her mother proved unable to care for her by herself.
- Sujit Kumar (1979), named the "Chicken Boy of Fiji" by the media, was born with cerebral palsy and epilepsy. Sujit's mother committed suicide when he was a toddler and his father left him confined under the house to live with the chickens. Sujit was rescued while still a boy and committed to the Samabula Old People's Home, where he was confined to his room and tied to his bed. He could not speak, and his only verbalisation was clucking; his only interaction with people consisted of outbursts. Sujit remained at the old people's home for 20 years until he was found by Elizabeth Clayton, a wealthy Australian businesswoman who founded the Happy Home Trust to care for Sujit and other at-risk Fijian children. Sujit's behaviour has improved, but it is assumed that he will never or later learn to speak, and he remains profoundly disabled.
- Danielle Crockett (2005), of Plant City, Florida, United States, had been locked in her room and deprived of any human interaction for the first seven years of her life, causing a variety of severe developmental delays. She was found and adopted, and, as of 2017, she lives in a group home. She has not learned how to speak but can now let people touch her, look others in the eyes, swim, and has made progress acclimating to human conditioning.
- Vanya Yudin (2008), the "Russian bird boy," is a seven-year-old boy who spent his entire life living in a tiny two-bedroom apartment surrounded by birds. His mother never spoke to him and treated him as a pet, and when found he was unable to communicate except for chirping and flapping his arms like wings.
- Natasha (2009), born in Chita, Zabaykalsky Krai, is a five-year-old girl who spent her entire life locked in a room with cats and dogs, and no heat, water, or sewage system. When she was found, she could not speak, would jump at the door and bark as caretakers left, and had "clear attributes of an animal."
- Sasha T. (2012) is a two-year-old Russian boy who was kept in a room with goats his entire life by his mother. Without any human contact, he had not learned how to speak, and weighed only about two-thirds as much as a typical child his age when he was discovered by Russian social workers.

== Hoaxes ==
Following the 2008 disclosure by Belgian newspaper Le Soir that the bestselling book Misha: A Mémoire of the Holocaust Years and movie Survivre avec les loups ('Surviving with Wolves') was a media hoax, the French media debated the credulity with which numerous cases of feral children have been unquestioningly accepted. Although there are numerous books on these children, almost none of them have been based on archives; the authors instead have used dubious second- or third-hand printed information. According to the French surgeon Serge Aroles, who wrote a general study of feral children based on archives (L'Enigme des Enfants-loups or The Enigma of Wolf-children, 2007), many alleged cases are totally fictitious stories:

- The teenager of Kronstadt (1781) – According to the Hungarian document published by Serge Aroles, this case is a hoax: the boy, mentally disabled, had a goitre and was exhibited for money.
- Syrian Gazelle Boy (1946) – A boy aged around 10 was reported to have been found in the midst of a herd of gazelles in the Syrian desert in the 1950s, and was only rescued with the help of an Iraqi army jeep, because he could run at speeds of up to 50 km/h (30 mph). However, it was supposedly a hoax, as are several other gazelle-boy cases.
- Amala and Kamala – Claimed to have been found in 1920 by missionaries near Midnapore, Calcutta region, India, later proved to be a hoax to gain charity for Rev. Singh's orphanage. Scholars from Japan and France launched a new inquiry about Amala and Kamala, and validated the discoveries and conclusions done by Serge Aroles 20 years before: the story was a hoax.
- Lucknow, India, (1954) – A girl named Ramu, taken by a wolf as a baby, and raised in the jungle until the age of seven. Aroles made inquiries on the scene and classifies this as another hoax.
- The Bear-girl of Krupina, Slovakia (1767) – Serge Aroles found no traces of her in the Krupina archives.

== Legend, fiction, and popular culture ==
Myths, legends, and fiction have depicted feral children reared by wild animals such as wolves, apes, monkeys, and bears. Famous examples include Romulus and Remus, Ibn Tufail's Hayy, Ibn al-Nafis' Kamil, Rudyard Kipling's Mowgli, Edgar Rice Burroughs's Tarzan, George of the Jungle and the legends of Atalanta and Enkidu.

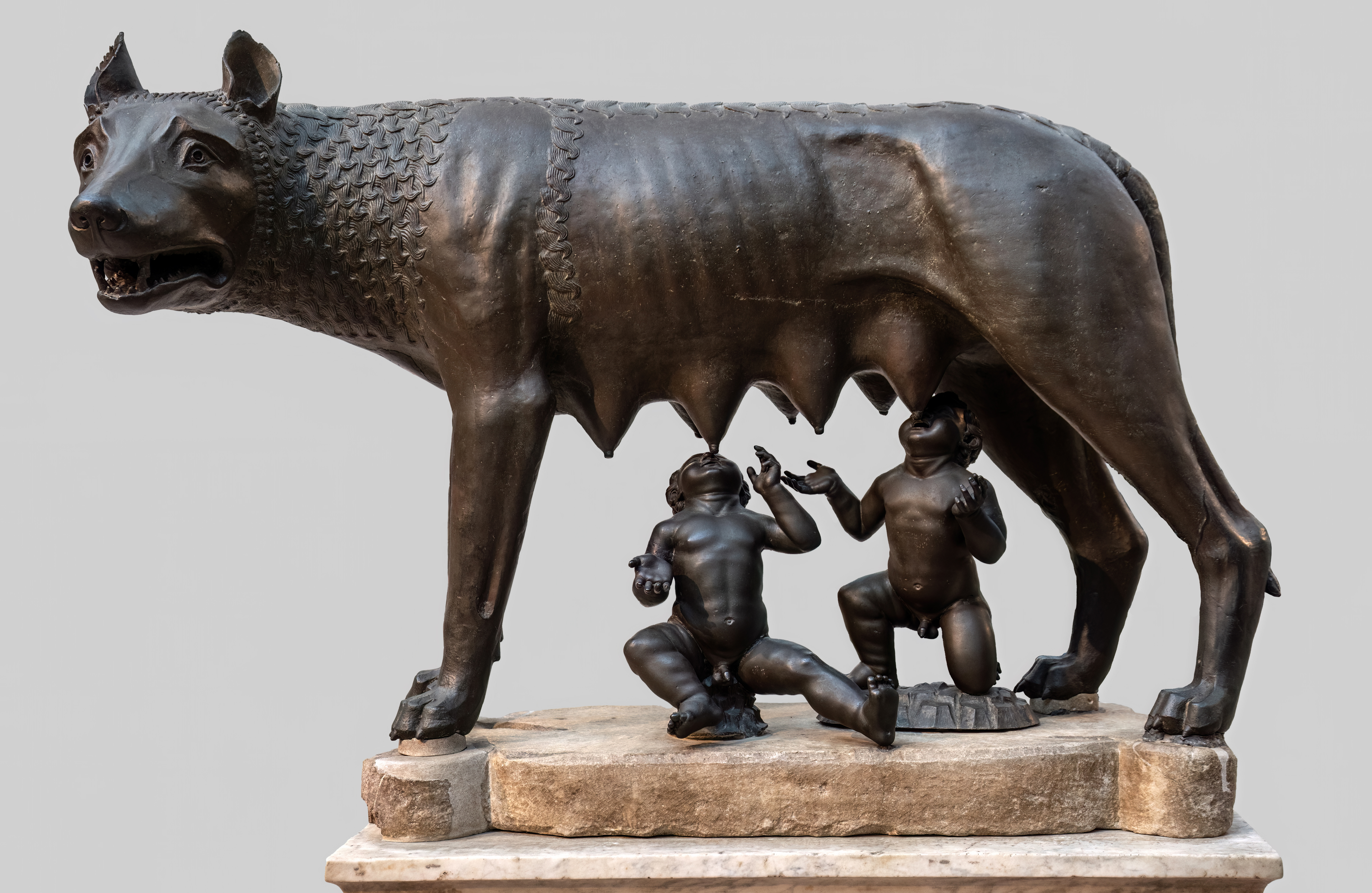
The Capitoline Wolf suckling Romulus and Remus

Roman legend has it that Romulus and Remus, twin sons of Rhea Silvia and Mars, were suckled by a she-wolf. Rhea Silvia was a priestess, and when it was found that she had been pregnant and had children, King Amulius, who had usurped his brother's throne, ordered her to be buried alive and for the children to be killed. The servant who was given the order set them in a basket on the Tiber river instead, and the children were taken by Tiberinus, the river god, to the shore where a she-wolf found them and raised them until they were discovered as toddlers by a shepherd named Faustulus. He and his wife Acca Larentia, who had always wanted a child but never had one, raised the twins, who would later feature prominently in the events leading up to the founding of Rome (named after Romulus, who eventually killed Remus in a fight over whether the city should be founded on the Palatine Hill or the Aventine Hill).

Legendary and fictional children are often depicted as growing up with relatively normal human intelligence and skills and an innate sense of culture or civilization, coupled with a healthy dose of survival instincts. Their integration into human society is made to seem relatively easy. One notable exception is Mowgli, for whom living with humans proved to be extremely difficult.

The book Knowledge of Angels involves a feral girl found on a fictional island based upon Mallorca. She is the subject of an experiment to see if the knowledge of God is learned or innate. Placed in a convent, while she is there the nuns are instructed not to teach her about God or even mention him in front of her. This is to see whether an atheist who washed up there should be condemned or not.

The Earthsea series by Ursula K. Le Guin mentions a brother and sister who were abandoned on a remote island as children, and thus grew up as feral children; in A Wizard of Earthsea, Ged washes up on their island and is unable to communicate much with them, as they only know a few words in their native language (which he did not speak at the time). They were both elderly and very frightened of him, but the sister gives him one of her few possessions when he leaves. Later in The Tombs of Atuan, Ged tells Tenar about the sister and brother (named Anthil and Ensar respectively), and Tenar explains their names, lineage, and how the abandonment was known about in their (and her) home country. Tenar and Ged agree that abandonment was kinder than the murder the children would have otherwise been victims of, but Ged remarks that it was still very cruel and "They scarcely knew human speech."

The 2006 novel Magic Hour by Kristin Hannah is about a six-year-old feral child living during her formative years inside a cave in the Olympic National Forest. The girl wanders one day into the fictional small town of Rain Valley, Washington, searching for food and carrying her pet wolf pup and unable to speak. The police chief calls in her psychiatrist sister to teach the girl how to speak and to find the girl's family.

== See also ==
- Child development – Stages in the development of children
- Cognitive ethology
- Critical period hypothesis – Hypothesis that younger people are better at language acquisition
- Hermit – Person who lives in seclusion from society
- Language deprivation experiments – Isolating infants from normal language
- Psychogenic dwarfism
- Street children – Homeless children living on the street
- Tarzanesque – Term used to describe Tarzan-like characters
- Wild man – Mythical figure

== Bibliography ==
- Sleeman, William (1888) [Single chapter of the work published in 1858 as A Journey Through the Kingdom of Oude]. "Wolves Nurturing Children In Their Dens". The Zoologist. ser.3, v.12: 87–98 + note p. 221. OCLC 173338280.
- Armen, Jean-Claude (1974) [1971 in French]. Gazelle-Boy: A Child Brought Up by Gazelles in the Sahara Desert. London: Bodley Head. ISBN 0370102843.
- For the first opportune critical approach based on archives : Aroles, Serge (2007). L'Enigme des enfants-loups [The Enigma of wolf-children] (in French). Editions Publibook. ISBN 978-2-7483-3909-3.
- Gale Encyclopedia of Psychology (2nd ed.). Gale Group. 2001. ISBN 978-0-7876-4786-5.
- Kidd, Kenneth B.; Worrell, Elijah (2004). Making American Boys: Boyology and the Feral Tale. Minneapolis: University of Minnesota Press. ISBN 0-8166-4295-8.
- Luchte, James (2012). Of the Feral Children. London: Createspace. ISBN 978-1-4792-9488-6.
- McCrone, John (1993). The Myth of Irrationality – The Science of the Mind from Plato to Star Trek. London: Macmillan. ISBN 0-333-57284-X.
- Michael, Newton (2002). Savage Boys and Wild Girls: A History of Feral Children. London: Faber and Faber. ISBN 0-571-21460-6.
- Reynolds, Cecil R.; Fletcher-Janzen, Elaine, eds. (2004), Concise Encyclopedia of Special Education: A Reference for the Education of the Handicapped and Other Exceptional Children and Adults (2 ed.), Hoboken, New Jersey: John Wiley & Sons, pp. 428–429, ISBN 978-0-471-65251-9, OCLC 46975017.
