= Galwegian =

Galwegian or Galwegians may refer to:

- Of Galway (disambiguation)
  - Of or pertaining to Galway, Ireland, or to its residents.
  - Galwegians RFC, rugby club in Galway, Ireland
- Of Galloway (disambiguation)
  - Of, or pertaining to, Galloway, Scotland, or to its historic people, language and culture.
  - Galwegian Gaelic, extinct dialect of Galloway, Scotland

== See also ==
- Glaswegian (of Glasgow)
