= Mead House (Galway, New York) =

Historic house in New York, United States

- U.S. National Register of Historic Places
- Location within New York Location within the United States
- Location: 2210 Galway Rd., Galway, New York
- Coordinates: 43°0′57″N 74°1′20″W
- Area: 18.7 acres (7.6 ha)
- Built: 1825
- Architectural style: Federal
- NRHP reference No.: 04000433
- Added to NRHP: May 12, 2004

Mead House is a historic home located at Galway in Saratoga County, New York. It was built about 1825 and is a 2-story, five-by-two-bay timber framed residence. It has a rectangular main block with an attached 2-story gable-roofed wing and 1 1/2-story kitchen wing. It center hall plan with vernacular Federal-style interior decoration. Also on the property is a contributing frame carriage barn.

It was added to the National Register of Historic Places in 2004.
