= Galway Lake =

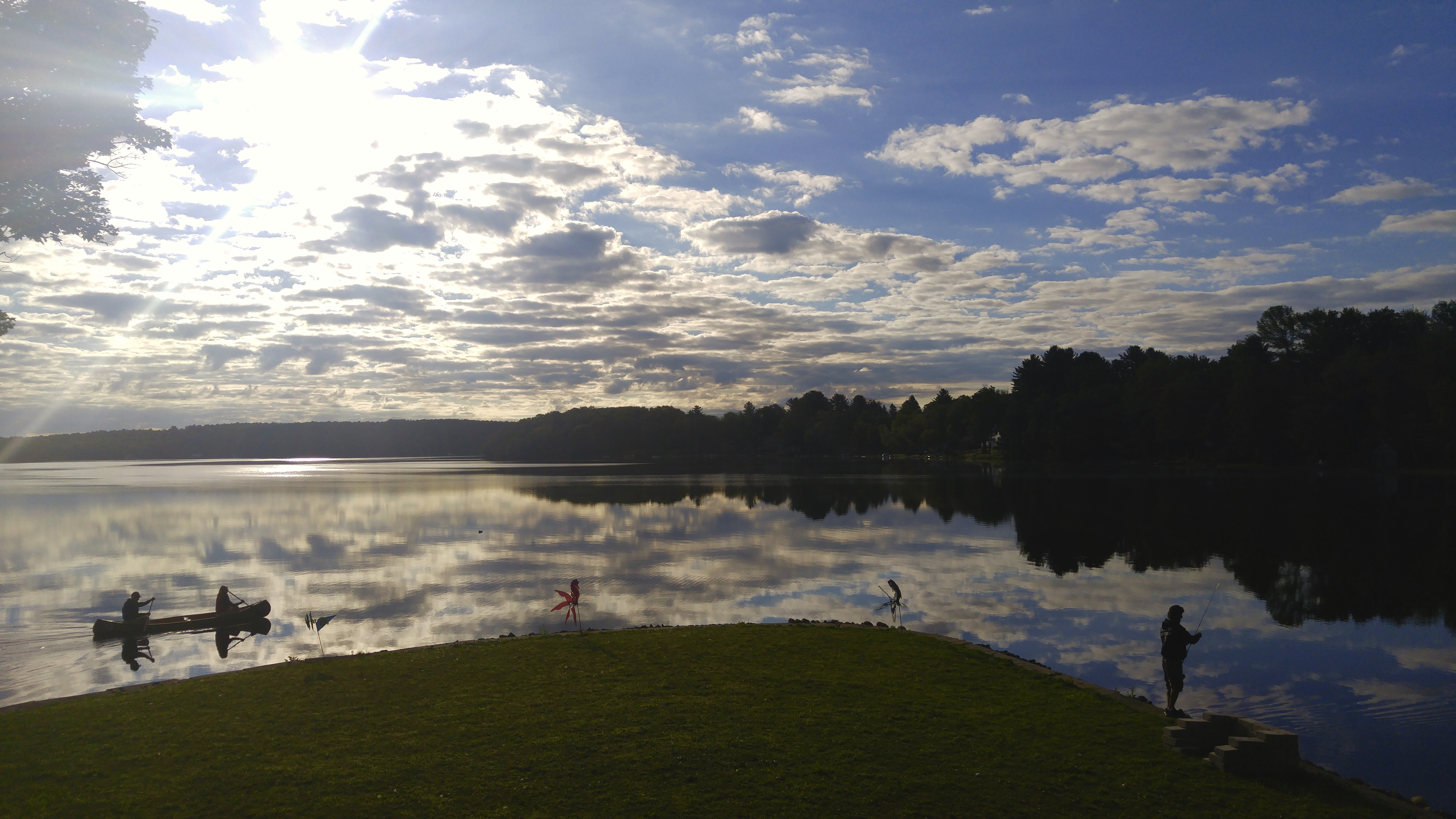

- Location within New York Location within the United States
- Location: Galway in Saratoga County, New York, United States
- Coordinates: 43°1′51.6″N 74°4′26.2″W
- Basin countries: United States
- Surface area: 564 acres (228 ha)
- Surface elevation: 955 ft (291 m)

Galway Lake is located west of Galway (village), New York, in the town of Galway in Saratoga County, New York, United States.

The lake was first constructed in 1855 to serve as a reservoir for the nearby City of Amsterdam, and was owned by the Amsterdam Water Works Company. Galway Lake was enlarged by the creation of the Galway Lake Dam on North Chuctanunda Creek in Saratoga County, New York, once used to power various mills and industries along the creek, and is now used solely for recreation purposes. Construction of the current Galway Lake Dam was completed in 1982, after the camper association purchased it from the Amsterdam Water Works Company for $1. At normal levels it has a surface area of 564 acres (228 ha). It is property of Galway Lake Campers Association.

At low levels the Lake is at 550 acres (220 ha); also, it currently permits only electric powered or sail boats.

The Lake is located at latitude - longitude coordinates (also known as lat-long or GPS coordinates) of N 43.02619 and W -74.08291. Galway Lake is shown in the center of the topographic (topo) map, which is sourced from the United States Geographical Survey map USGS Galway quad.

== See also ==
- List of lakes in New York
