= Francis Putnam Burns =

American piano maker

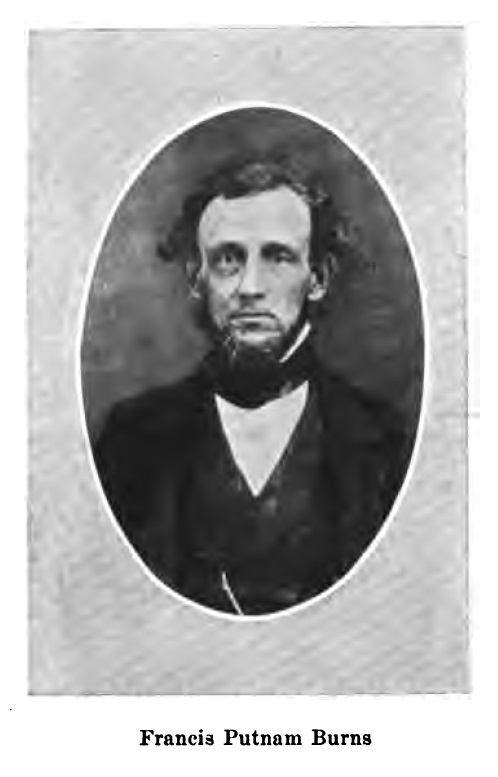
F. P. Burns portrait in "Pianos and Their Makers"

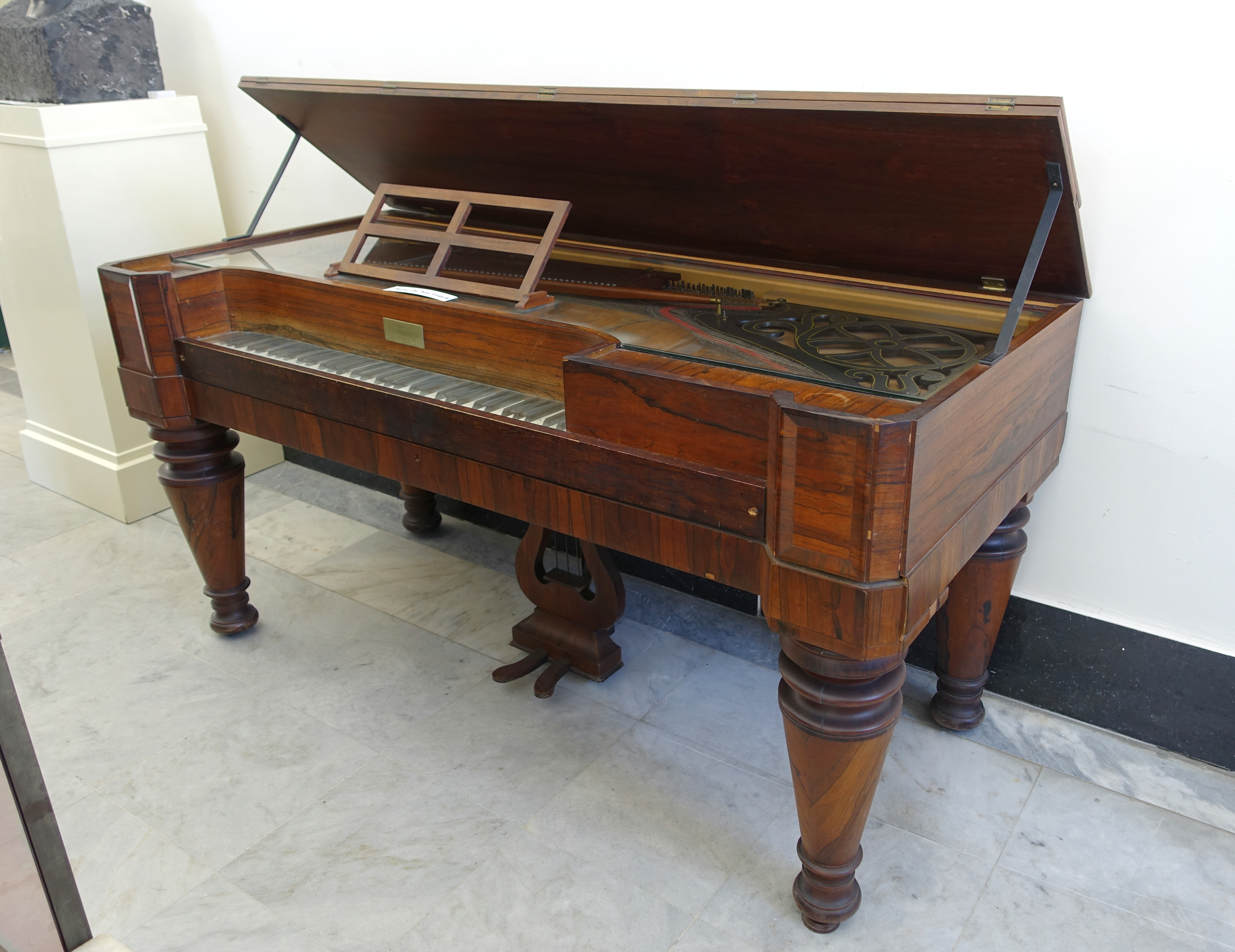
Piano, F. P. Burns of Albany, c. 1848

Francis Putnam Burns (February 6, 1807 – ) was a pioneering American piano maker in Albany, New York. Burns was born in Galway, New York and trained as a cabinet-maker. He learned the craft of piano-making from John Osborne at Meacham & Co. in Albany, and from 1834-1835 was partnered with Thomas Clemence in that city. He then began the F. P. Burns Company to manufacture pianos, and won a diploma in 1847 from the New York State Agricultural Society for "best piano". Although the firm nearly went bankrupt during the American Civil War, his son Edward returned on disability and saved the company.

A Burns piano was reportedly the first piano in California. According to an 1884 article in the Santa Cruz Daily Surf: "It was made in Albany by E P Burns [sic] and brought around Cape Horn in the fall of 1849 by Capt Wilson, and was put together on the schooner where its delightful strains helped to vary the monotony of the long voyage. It was regarded as a great curiosity when it arrived in San Francisco and crowds flocked to see the instrument and listen to its melody."
