= Serge Aroles =

French surgeon and author

- Occupation: surgeon

Serge Aroles is a French surgeon and author who is best known for his research on feral children and Zaga Christ.

== Works on the feral child ==
Aroles found evidence that the feral girl Marie-Angélique Memmie Le Blanc had survived for ten years living wild in the forests of France, between the ages of nine and 19, before she was captured by villagers in Songy in Champagne-Ardenne in September 1731. He discovered too that she had been born in 1712 as a Native American of the Meskwaki (or "Fox") people in what today is the midwestern U.S. state of Wisconsin, and that she died in Paris in 1775, aged 63. Aroles demonstrated also that Marie-Angélique learned to read and write as an adult, thus making her unique among feral children.

For his second book, L’Enigme des enfants-loups, Aroles investigated every known report of a "feral child" in the world, between the years 1304 and 1954, through a four-year search for archival verification of these reports. He draws the conclusion that only one case is authentic: that of Marie-Angélique Memmie Le Blanc. All the rest – including the most famous ones, the "Victor" of the French director François Truffaut’s film L'Enfant sauvage (1970) and the Kaspar Hauser of the German director Werner Herzog’s The Enigma of Kaspar Hauser (1974) – are, he argues, either undocumented, simply mistaken, deliberate hoaxes, or frauds for monetary gain.

His profile on the website of his Paris publishers states: "The author, a surgeon, who conducted these enquiries [for his book L'Enigme des enfants-loups] between 1995 and 1998 on four continents, presents the first full scientific explanation of wolf-children, infants raised by a lonely she-wolf : the pseudopregnancy, a common neuroendocrine disorder in she-wolves.

His research focuses now on ancient Ethiopian manuscripts and on the biography of Zaga Christ, king of Ethiopia in exile, who died in France in 1638."

== See also ==
- Feral child
- Marie-Angelique Memmie Le Blanc
- Amala and Kamala
