= Amala and Kamala =

Feral children from Bengal, India

- Born: c. 1918 c. 1912
- Died: 21 September 1921 (3 years old); 14 November 1929 (17 years old)

Amala (c. 1918 – 21 September 1921) and Kamala (c. 1912 – 14 November 1929) were two "feral girls" from Midnapore, Bengal (Currently West Bengal), India, who were alleged to have been raised by a wolf family.

Their story attracted substantial mainstream attention and debate. However, the account was reported and promoted by only one source, the clergyman who claimed to have discovered the girls. Because of this, there is some controversy as to the authenticity of the story. French surgeon Serge Aroles concluded in his book L'Enigme des enfants-loup (Enigma of the Wolf-Children, 2007) that the story was a hoax.

== Description ==
In 1926, Joseph Amrito Lal Singh, the director of the local orphanage, published an account in The Statesman saying that the two girls were given to him by a man who lived in the jungle near the village of Godamuri, in the district of Midnapore, west of Calcutta, and that the girls, when he first saw them, lived in a sort of cage near the house. Later, he claimed that he himself rescued the girls from the wolves' den on 9 October 1920. He named the children and wrote his observations of them in a "diary" (consisting of loose sheets, some dated and some undated) for almost ten years – which, if accurate, would represent one of the best documented efforts to observe and rehabilitate feral children. The diary entry of 17 October 1920 states, "...the mother wolf, whose nature was so ferocious and affection so sublime. It struck me with wonder. I was simply amazed to think that an animal had such a noble feeling surpassing even that of mankind ... to bestow all the love and affection of a fond and ideal mother on these peculiar beings." Kamala was at the time about eight years old, Amala about 18 months.

== Behaviour and treatment ==
Singh claims in his diary that, at the orphanage, the two girls showed wolf-like behaviour typical for feral children. They would not allow themselves to be dressed, scratched and bit people who tried to feed them, rejected cooked food and walked on all fours. Both girls had developed thick calluses on their palms and knees from having walked on all fours. The girls were mostly nocturnal, had an aversion to sunshine, and could see very well in the dark. They also exhibited an acute sense of smell and an enhanced ability to hear.

The girls enjoyed the taste of raw meat and would eat out of a bowl on the ground. They seemed to be insensitive to cold and heat and appeared to show no human emotions of any kind, apart from fear. At night they would howl like wolves, calling out to their "family". They did not speak.

Unity author Imelda Octavia Shanklin referred to their case in her 1929 book, What Are You?: "I once heard a missionary tell of seeing two girls who had been rescued from a den of wolves in Asia. As babies they had been abandoned, and, in a measure duplicating the young lives of Romulus and Remus, had been mothered by a female wolf. The children ran fleetly on all fours; they snarled and bit at their captors. The forehead retreated, the lower face protruded in unmistakable likeness to the foster-parent beast that had shown them more of mother love than their human mothers had shown."

Singh claims that he took on the difficult task of trying to teach them ordinary human behaviour. Amala died in 1921 of a kidney infection. She was buried in St. John's Churchyard, Midnapore under St. John's Church, Midnapore. Kamala showed signs of mourning at her death. After this, Kamala became more approachable. She was eventually partially house-trained and became used to the company of other human beings. After years of hard work, she was able to walk upright a little, although never proficiently and would often revert to all fours when she needed to go somewhere quickly, and learned to speak a few words. She died in 1929 of tuberculosis at the age of 17.

== Controversy ==
Due to conflicting descriptions, none of them substantiated by any witnesses other than Mr Singh himself, there persists considerable controversy as to the veracity of the account. The "myth" of having been raised by animals is an ancient Indo-European explanation for the animal-like behaviour of abandoned children with congenital defects.

The French surgeon Serge Aroles researched archives and formerly unknown sources and published the following conclusions in a book, L'Enigme des enfants-loup (Enigma of the Wolf-Children, 2007):

- Both Amala and Kamala existed, but Singh's claims about them being raised by wolves are false.
- The original diary which Singh claimed to have written "day after day during the life of the two wolf-girls" was written after 1935, six years after Kamala's death. The writings are kept in the manuscripts division of the U.S. Library of Congress in Washington, D.C..
- The pictures showing two girls walking on all fours and eating raw meat were taken in 1937, after the deaths of Amala and Kamala. The subjects of the photographs are two different girls posing at Singh's request.
- According to the medical doctor in charge of the orphanage, Kamala had none of the anomalies invented by Singh, such as very sharp and long teeth, all-four locomotion with fixed joints, or nocturnal vision with emission of an intense blue glare by her eyes during the night.
- According to several testimonies collected in 1951–1952, Singh physically abused Kamala in order to make her act as he had described in front of visitors.
- Aroles received letters between Singh and Professor Robert M. Zingg, in which Zingg expresses his belief in the financial value of the story and requesting to collaborate on its publication. After his publication of Singh's diary, Zingg sent a royalty payment of 500 USD to Singh, who needed extra funds to maintain the orphanage.
- Zingg took Singh at his word as to the authenticity of his accounting of the girls. The book he co-authored with Singh, Wolf-Children and Feral Man, drew extensive criticism from anthropologists, the most outspoken of whom being Ashley Montagu. Zingg was exposed for his failure to independently verify the authenticity of Singh's account and the fallout of this controversy resulted in Dr. Zingg's dismissal from his academic post at the University of Denver in 1942. He never taught again after the scandal.
- Kamala had a neurodevelopmental disorder, Rett syndrome.

Scholars from Japan and France have supported Aroles' conclusions.

== References in culture ==
- Bhanu Kapil's book "Humanimal, A Project for Future Children" focuses heavily on Amala and Kamala and reclaiming their story from the mediation of Reverend Mr Singh.
- Jane Yolen's book Children of the Wolf is a fictionalized account of the story for young adult readers.
- Jane Yolen and Heidi E.Y. Stemple's book History Mystery: The Wolf Girls is a children's non-fiction book about the account.
- Lord Robert Baden-Powell gives a short account of the story in Chapter 6 of his 1940 book, More Sketches of Kenya
- Arnold Gesell's book Wolf Child and Human Child is also heavily based on Singh's account which it presents uncritically.
- Fringe (TV series), a HBO series, mentions them in Season 1, Episode 15 ( Inner Child (Fringe))
- Shinichi Suzuki in Nurtured by Love. (Suzuki method)
- Joseph Chilton Pearce’s book The Crack in the Cosmic Egg: Challenging Constructs of Mind and Reality mentions the two girls at the beginning of chapter 3.

== Sources ==
- John McCrone (1994). "Wolf Children and the Bifold Mind". The Myth of Irrationality: The Science of the Mind from Plato to Star Trek. Carroll & Graf Pub. Archived from the original on 10 March 2003.
- David Horthersall (2004). History of Psychology.
- P. J. Blumenthal: Kaspar Hausers Geschwister – Auf der Suche nach dem wilden Menschen (Deuticke, Vienna/Frankfurt, 2003, ISBN 3-216-30632-1)
