= Claude-Rémy Buirette de Verrières =

Claude Rémy Buirette de Verrières (22 March 1749, Verrières, Marne, France – 9 January 1793, Brussels) was a lawyer, historian, author and French revolutionary.

He was the author of four books about the history and antiquities of the city of Châlons-en-Champagne and the region of Champagne (historical province) in north-eastern France.

An early supporter of the French Revolution, Buirette, despite being a hunchback, was put in command of revolutionary troops in Paris and later became military governor of the seaport of Antwerp. He is said to have been a friend of the prominent French revolutionary Jean-Paul Marat.
