= Mary Evalin Warren =

American author, lecturer and social reformer

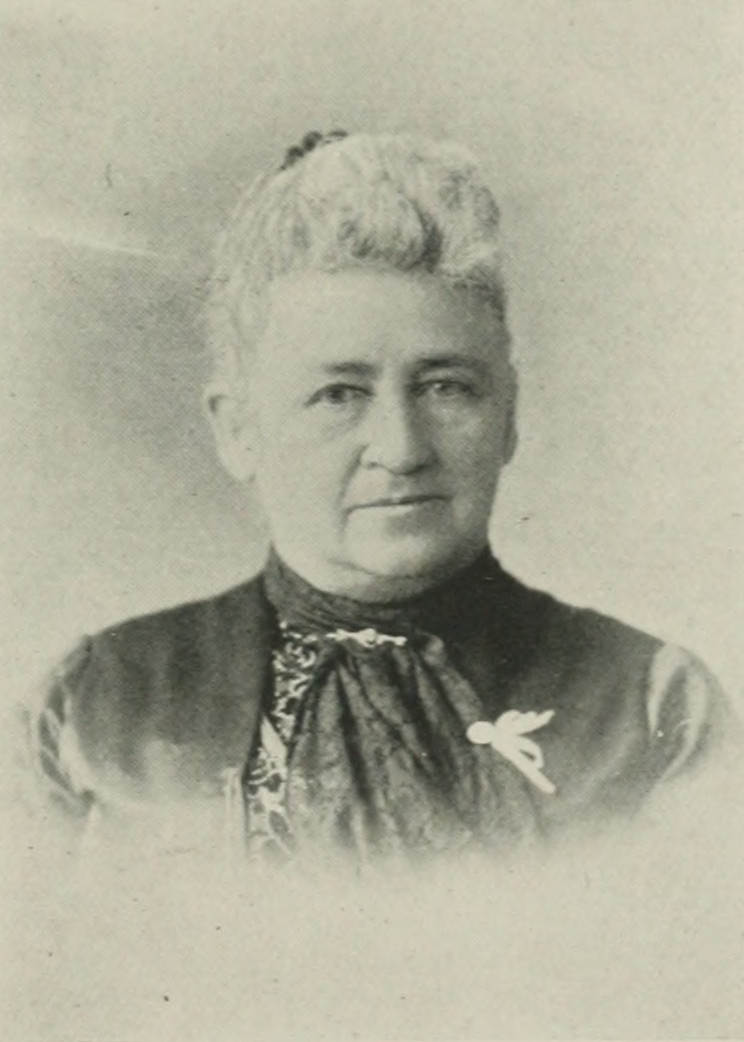
- Photo in A Woman of the Century
- Born: Mary Evalin West; March 14, 1829; Galway, New York, U.S.
- Died: October 16, 1904 (aged 75); Fox Lake, Wisconsin, U.S.
- Resting place: Riverside Memorial Park, Fox Lake, Wisconsin
- Occupations: author; lecturer; social reformer
- Spouse: George Warren (m. 1848; died 1900)
- Children: 3 sons, 1 daughter

Mary Evalin Warren (née, West; March 14, 1829 – October 16, 1904) was an American author, lecturer, and social reformer, but was equally prominent as a church member and representative and officer in societies. Warren, for many years prominent in temperance reform, was a member of the Woman's Christian Temperance Union (WCTU) from its first organization and she had a field of her own for propagating the work at Wayland University, Beaver Dam, Wisconsin, where she furnished money to erect a dormitory for girls called the "Warren Cottage.” She joined the Good Templars' order in 1878 and filled all the subordinate lodge offices to which women usually aspired, and as grand-vice-templar, she lectured to large audiences in nearly all parts of Wisconsin. For 35 years, she resided near Fox Lake, Wisconsin where she was prominently identified with various charitable and literary associations.

== Early life and education ==
Mary Evalin West was born in Galway, New York, March 14, 1829. When eight years of age, her mother died and Warren was "bound out" for ten years to a farmer in the neighborhood. This afforded meager educational facilities in early life.

== Career ==
On April 16, 1848, she married George Warren, in the town of Ballston, New York. He had already taken up a homestead on the spot since known as Laurel Hill in Trenton, Wisconsin, and immediately after marriage, the couple came to their new home in Trenton, near Fox Lake. The couple united with the Baptist Church in Fox Lake in 1859, and had continuous membership since that time. The couple had four children of which three sons -Frank, Frederick, and Walter- survived and a daughter died in infancy. Warren also reared and cared for six motherless girls, at different periods, until most of them found homes of their own.

For many years, she was a church worker, especially prominent in connection with the cause of home and foreign missions. She took a great interest in Wayland University, a Baptist college in Beaver Dam, Wisconsin, and provided funding to erect a dormitory for girls, called "Warren Cottage." She was a prominent member of the State Agricultural Society, and on invitation, furnished several papers at the annual meetings of the society.

For many years, Warren was prominent in temperance reform. She joined the Good Templar Order in 1878. She filled all subordinate lodge offices, was prominent in district lodges, filled all the offices in the grand lodge to which women usually aspire, and as grand vice-templar several terms, lectured to large audiences in nearly all parts of Wisconsin. She attended several sessions of the right worthy grand lodge and filled several important offices of honor and trust therein. She was a member of the WCTU ever since it was organized, and took a deep interest in its success.

Warren wrote and had published three books, two in pamphlet form, entitled Our Laurels and Little Jakie, the Boot-Black. A large volume in cloth entitled Compensation, was widely read. It was characterized by Carol Mattingly in Well-Tempered Women: Nineteenth-Century Temperance Rhetoric (2000) as a typical example of husbands' infidelity.

== Personal life ==
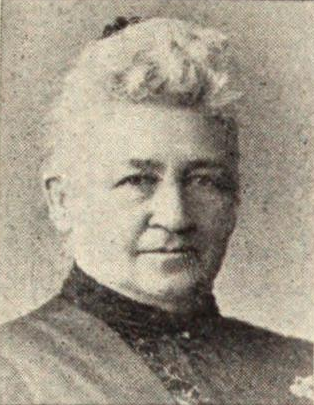
1904

Warren was a woman suffragist. Politically, she was a radical Republican until long after the civil war, but in later years, she identified with the Prohibition Party.

For more than fifty years, their home was in Trenton, but soon after Mr. Warren's death on August 15, 1900, the family moved to Fox Lake. She died at Fox Lake, October 16, 1904, aged 75, having been seriously ill for several weeks with breast cancer.

== Selected works ==
- Our Laurels
- Little Jakie, the Boot-Black
- Compensation
