= St. John's Church, Midnapore =

Church in West Bengal

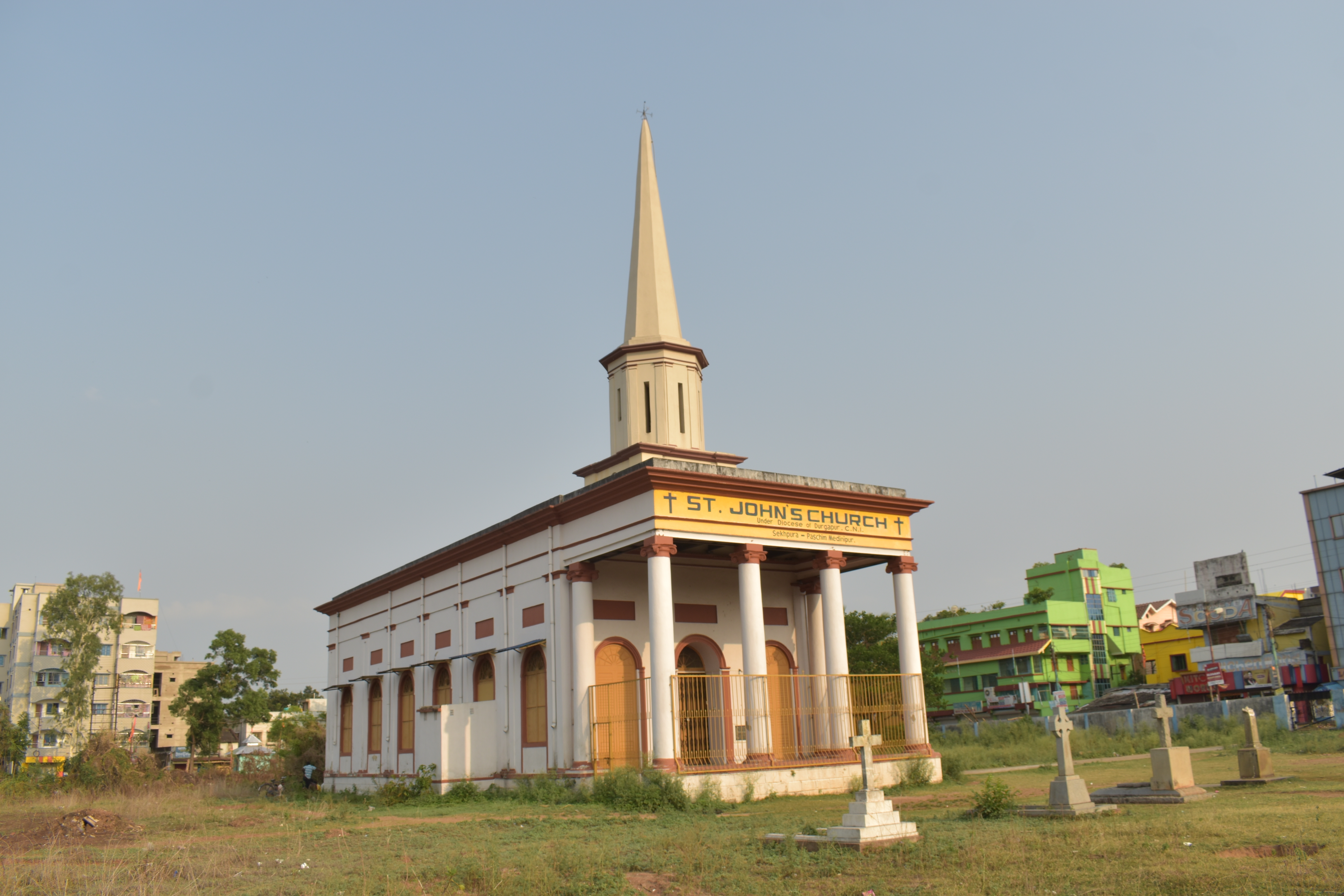
St John’s Church in Medinipur

St. John's Church, Midnapore is a church made by the Church Mission Society of England. It was built in 1851 at Sekpura in Midnapore, Paschim Medinipur district in the Indian state of West Bengal. There are several notable graves inside the St. John's Churchyard, Midnapore. It is under the Diocese of Durgapur, C. N. I.

== Graves ==
- Amala
- Bernard Edward John Burge (District Magistrate and soldier, assassinated in 1933)
- James Peddie (District Magistrate and soldier, assassinated in 1931)
- Robert Douglas
- Lucie Mavourneen
