= Galway (village), New York =

Galway
- Village
- Village of Galway
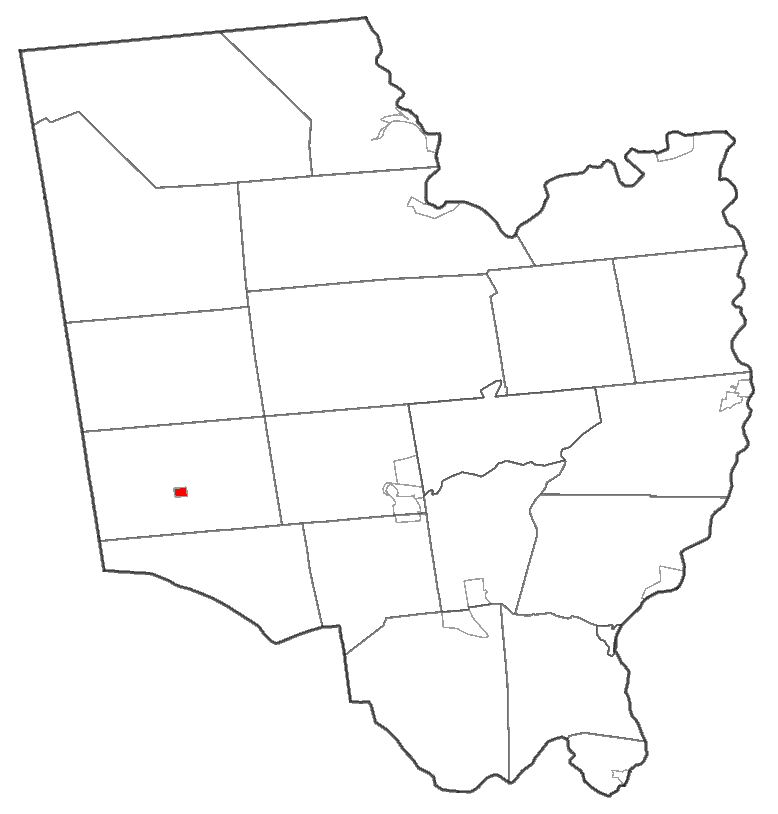
- Map highlighting Galway's location within Saratoga County.

- Location within the state of New York
- Coordinates: 43°1′0″N 74°2′2″W
- Country: United States
- State: New York
- County: Saratoga
- Town: Galway
- Incorporated: 1838
- Named for: Galway, Ireland

Area
  - Total: 0.25 sq mi (0.66 km^{2})
  - Land: 0.25 sq mi (0.66 km^{2})
  - Water: 0 sq mi (0.00 km^{2})
- Elevation: 830 ft (253 m)

Population (2020)
  - Total: 165
  - Density: 644.6/sq mi (248.88/km^{2})
- Time zone: UTC-5 (Eastern (EST))
  - Summer (DST): UTC-4 (EDT)
- ZIP code: 12074
- Area code: 518
- FIPS code: 36-28101
- GNIS feature ID: 0950865
- Website: Village of Galway

Galway is a village in the town of Galway in Saratoga County, New York, United States. The population was 200 at the 2010 census. The village is north of Schenectady. Galway Lake, a vacation area, is west of the village.

== History ==
The first settlers in the town established themselves south of Galway village.

In 1838, the village of Galway was incorporated. The charter was amended in 1869.

== Geography ==
According to the United States Census Bureau, the village has a total area of 0.3 square mile (0.7 km^{2}), all land.

Galway is at the junction of County Road 45 (East Street/West Street) and New York State Route 147 (North Street/South Street) in the central part of the town.

== Demographics ==
Historical population
| Census | Pop. | Note | %± |
|---|---|---|---|
| 1880 | 187 | | — |
| 1890 | 177 | | −5.3% |
| 1900 | 177 | | 0.0% |
| 1910 | 112 | | −36.7% |
| 1920 | 94 | | −16.1% |
| 1930 | 119 | | 26.6% |
| 1940 | 161 | | 35.3% |
| 1950 | 188 | | 16.8% |
| 1960 | 309 | | 64.4% |
| 1970 | 270 | | −12.6% |
| 1980 | 245 | | −9.3% |
| 1990 | 151 | | −38.4% |
| 2000 | 214 | | 41.7% |
| 2010 | 200 | | −6.5% |
| 2020 | 165 | | −17.5% |
U.S. Decennial Census

As of the census of 2000, there were 214 people, 82 households, and 71 families residing in the village. The population density was 834.4 inhabitants per square mile (322.2/km^{2}). There were 85 housing units at an average density of 331.4 per square mile (128.0/km^{2}). The racial makeup of the village was 99.53% White, and 0.47% from two or more races.

There were 82 households, out of which 37.8% had children under the age of 18 living with them, 63.4% were married couples living together, 17.1% had a female householder with no husband present, and 13.4% were non-families. 13.4% of all households were made up of individuals, and 7.3% had someone living alone who was 65 years of age or older. The average household size was 2.61 and the average family size was 2.75.

In the village, the population was spread out, with 25.7% under the age of 18, 8.4% from 18 to 24, 29.9% from 25 to 44, 24.3% from 45 to 64, and 11.7% who were 65 years of age or older. The median age was 39 years. For every 100 females, there were 91.1 males. For every 100 females age 18 and over, there were 84.9 males.

The median income for a household in the village was $32,000, and the median income for a family was $33,750. Males had a median income of $27,500 versus $19,821 for females. The per capita income for the village was $18,299. About 21.4% of families and 25.4% of the population were below the poverty line, including 55.7% of those under the age of eighteen and none of those 65 or over.
