= Joseph-Aignan Sigaud de Lafond =

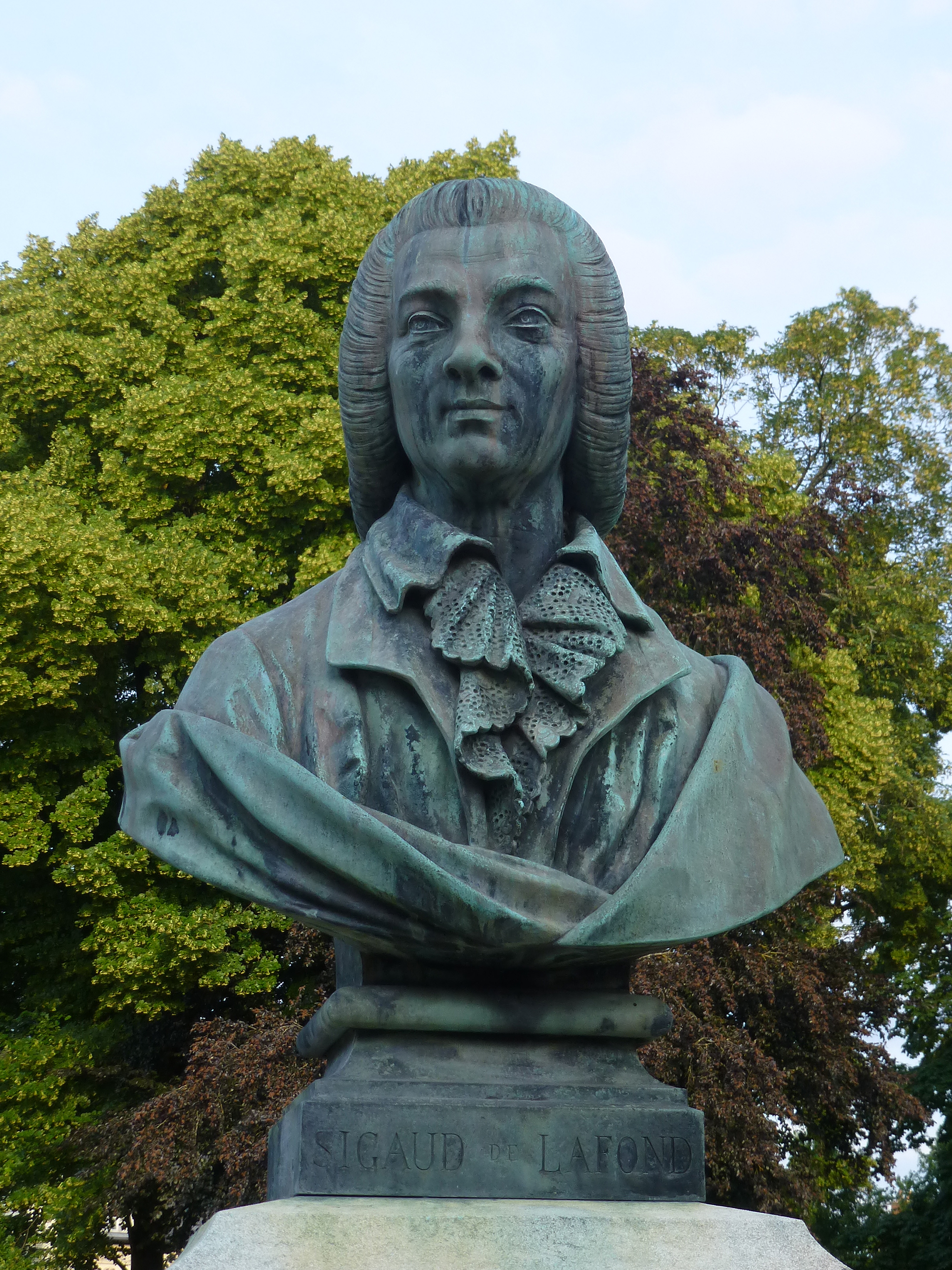
- Bust of Sigaud de Lafond, in Bourges
- Born: 5 January 1730; Bourges
- Died: 26 January 1810 (aged 80); Bourges
- Other names: A. J. S. D.
- Occupations: Obstetrician, physicist, chemist, teacher, and writer

Joseph-Aignan Sigaud de Lafond (5 January 1730, Bourges – 26 January 1810, Bourges) was a French experimental physicist, chemist, obstetrician, professor, and writer.

He originally planned to be a Jesuit priest, but decided to study to become a physician instead. While pursuing a medical career as an obstetrician, he became one of the most dedicated attendants of the lectures by the abbot Jean-Antoine Nollet (1700–1770). In 1760, he succeeded Nollet to the chair of experimental physics at the Collège Louis le Grand in Paris. In 1795, he became a professor of physics and chemistry at the École Centrale. His treatise Description et usage d'un cabinet de physique (Paris, 1775) is a compendium of the experimental physics of his time. He was a student of Jean Antoine Nollet.

== Writings ==
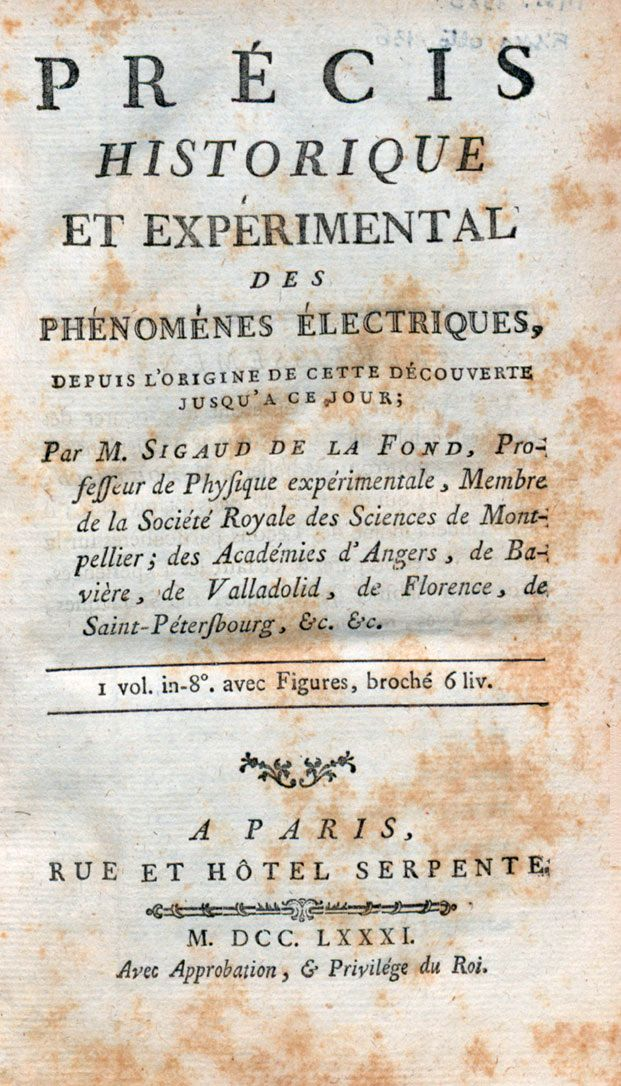
Précis historique et expérimental des phénoménes électriques, depuis l'origine de cette découverte jusqu'a ce jour, 1781

He was a prolific author, writing treatises on experimental physics, particularly those dealing with electricity, alongside almanacs and works on religion.

- Leçons de physique expérimentale (Lessons in Experimental Physics. 1767; 2 volumes: 1 and 2)
- Leçons sur l’économie animale (Lessons on Animal Economy. 1767; 2 volumes)
- Cours de physique expérimentale et de mathématiques (Course in Experimental Physics and Mathematics. 1769; 3 volumes, translation of work by Pieter van Musschenbroek)
- Lettre à Monsieur de Casan sur l'Electricité médicale (Letter to Monsieur de Casan on Medical Electricity. 1771)
- Traité de l'électricité (Treatise on Electricity. 1771)
- Various calendars and almanacs (Various Calendars and Almanacs. From 1772 to 1782)
- Récréations mathématiques et physiques (Mathematical and Physical Recreations. 1778; 4 volumes)
- Dictionnaire de physique (Dictionary of Physics. 1781; 4 volumes: 1, 3, 4)
- Dictionnaire des merveilles de la nature (Dictionary of the Marvels of Nature. 1781-1802; 3 volumes)
- École du bonheur ou tableau des vertus sociales (School of Happiness, or Table of Social Virtues. 1782-1791)
- Description et usage d'un cabinet de physique expérimentale (Description and Use of a Cabinet of Experimental Physics. 1784; 2 volumes)
- Précis historique et expérience des phénomènes électriques depuis l'origine de cette découverte jusqu'à nos jours (Historical Account and Experiment of Electrical Phenomena from the Origin of this Discovery to the Present Day. 1785; 1)
- La religion défendue contre l'incrédulité du siècle (Religion Defended Against the Incredulity of the Century. 1785; 6 volumes)
- Économie de la Providence dans l'établissement de la religion (Economy of Providence in the Establishment of Religion. 1787; 2 volumes)
- Elémens de physique théorique et expérimentale (Elements of Theoretical and Experimental Physics. 1787; 4 volumes)
- Bibliothèque universelle des dames - Physique générale et particulière (Universal Ladies' Library - General and Particular Physics. 1788-1792)
- Traité de physique particulière (Treatise on Particular Physics. 1792)
- Examen de quelques principes erronés en électricité (Examination of Some Erroneous Principles in Electricity. 1796)
- De l'électricité médicale (On Medical Electricity. 1802)
