= Galway, New York =

Galway
- Town
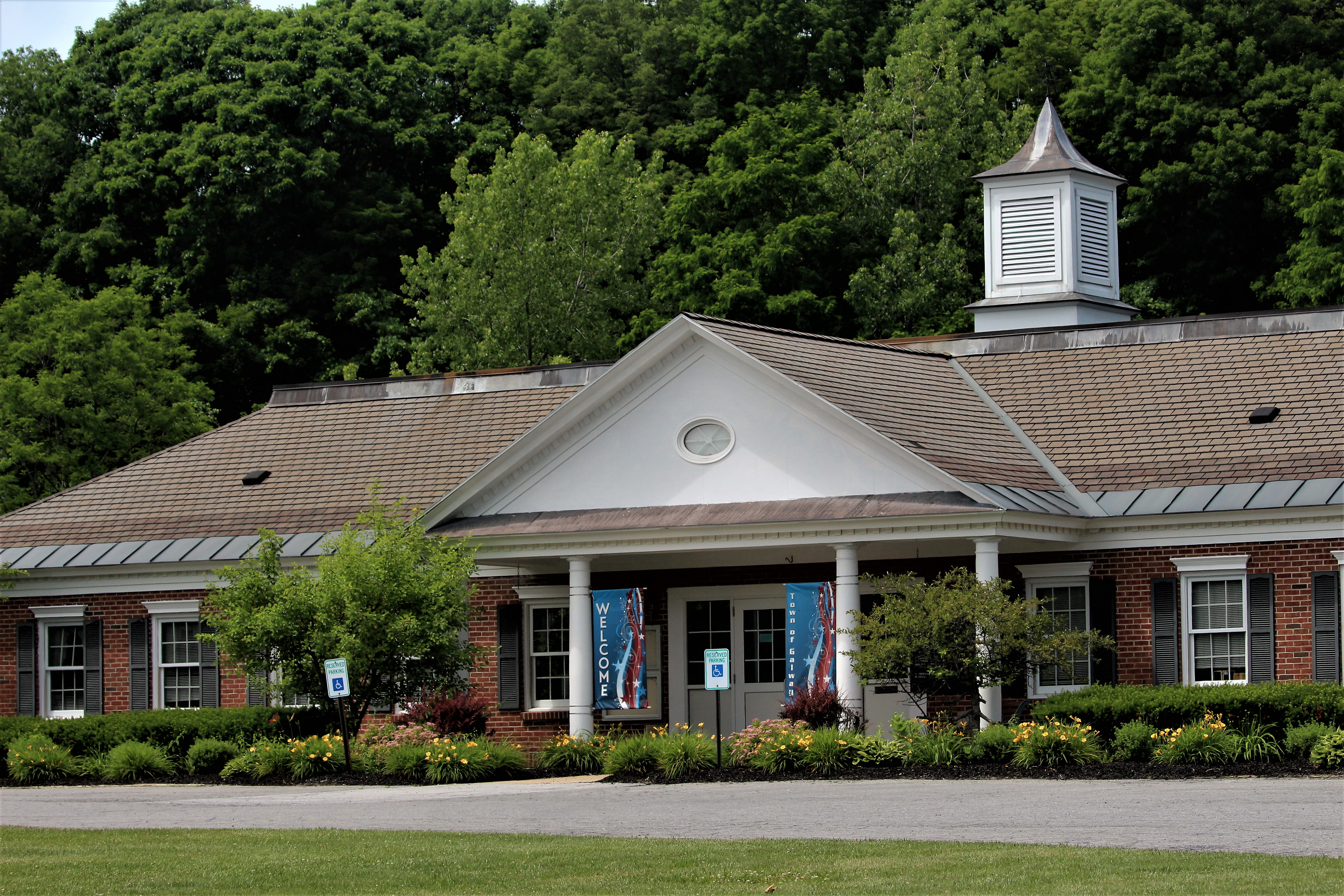
- Town hall

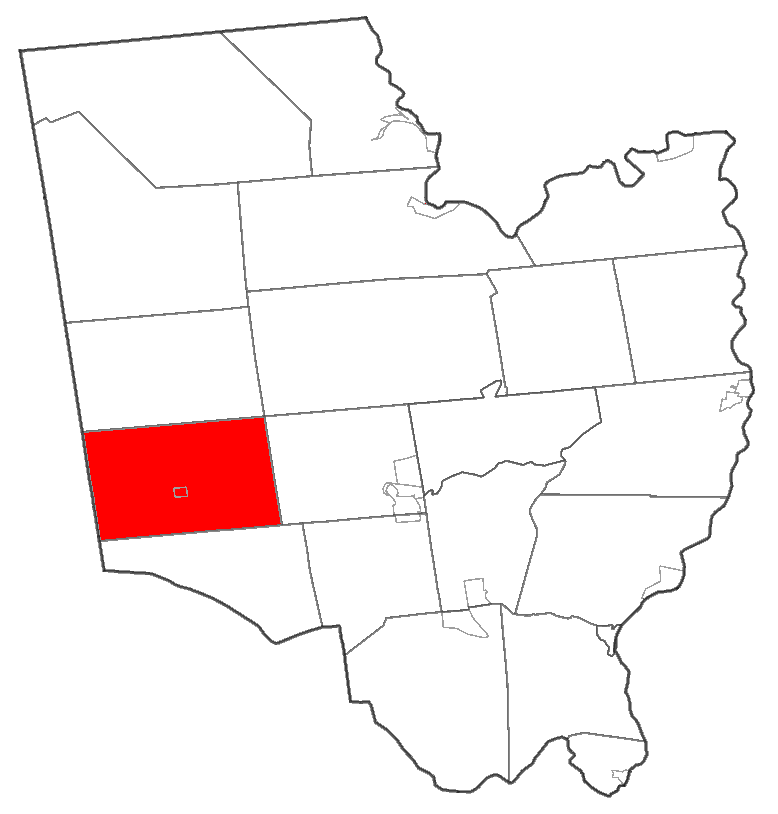
- Map highlighting Galway's location within Saratoga County.

- Location with the state of New York
- Coordinates: 43°01′43″N 74°01′35″W
- Country: United States
- State: New York
- County: Saratoga
- Settled: 1774
- Established: 1792
- Named for: Galloway, Scotland

Area
  - Total: 45.00 sq mi (116.56 km^{2})
  - Land: 43.82 sq mi (113.50 km^{2})
  - Water: 1.18 sq mi (3.06 km^{2})

Population (2020)
  - Total: 3,525
  - Density: 80.44/sq mi (31.06/km^{2})
- Time zone: UTC-5 (EST)
  - Summer (DST): UTC-4 (EDT)
- Area code: 518
- FIPS code: 36-091-28112
- Website: Town of Galway

Galway (US: /ˈɡælweɪ/) is a town located in Saratoga County, New York, United States. As of the 2020 census, the town had a total population of 3,525. The town contains a village also named Galway. Both the town and village are located in the western part of the county, north of Schenectady.

Galway is a rural community with a mixture of small business, farming, and residential homes. The town is home to both year-round and seasonal residents. It was originally named New Galloway after Galloway in Scotland. When the town was incorporated, however, it was incorrectly recorded as Galway. Although the spelling is the same as Galway, Ireland, it is not pronounced the same.

== History ==
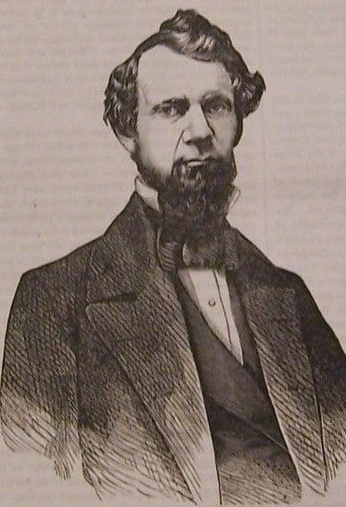
Chauncey Vibbard

The region was first settled in October 1774 on the corner of what is today known as Donnan and Sacandaga Roads in the southern section of town, outside of Galway village.

The town was formed from the town of Ballston in 1792 as the town of "New Galloway." The town of Providence was taken off the north part of Galway in 1796.

The hamlet of Galway incorporated as a village in 1838.

The Mead House was listed on the National Register of Historic Places in 2004.

== Notable people ==
- Horace Carpentier, First mayor and one of the founders of Oakland, California; capitalist, entrepreneur, philanthropist
- Glendon Scott Crawford, mechanic, unsuccessful domestic terrorist, and member of the Ku Klux Klan, lived in Galway.
- Joseph Henry, American scientist, briefly lived in the town.
- Allen Potter, Native of Galway, New York. US congressman, First Mayor of Kalamazoo, Michigan
- Chauncey Vibbard, organizer of the New York Central Railroad, Congressman and Superintendent of Railroads for the Union in the American Civil War was a native of Galway
- Mary Evalin Warren (1829–1904), author, lecturer, social reformer

== Geography ==
According to the United States Census Bureau, the town has a total area of 45.0 square mile (116.6 km^{2}, of which 44.0 square miles (114.0 km^{2}) is land and 1.0 square mile (2.6 km^{2}) (2.20%) is water.

The western town line is the border of Fulton County.

New York State Route 29 is an east–west highway in the northern part of Galway. It intersects New York State Route 147 at Kimball Corners.

Adjacent areas
The town of Galway is bordered on the west by towns of Perth and Broadalbin in Fulton County, the east by the town of Milton, the north by the town of Providence, and the south by the town of Charlton.

== Demographics ==
Historical population
Census	Pop.	Note	%±
1800	2,310		—
1810	2,705		17.1%
1820	2,579		−4.7%
1830	2,710		5.1%
1840	2,412		−11.0%
1850	2,158		−10.5%
1860	2,427		12.5%
1870	2,174		−10.4%
1880	1,902		−12.5%
1890	1,635		−14.0%
1900	1,350		−17.4%
1910	1,205		−10.7%
1920	1,101		−8.6%
1930	1,137		3.3%
1940	1,244		9.4%
1950	1,408		13.2%
1960	1,746		24.0%
1970	2,506		43.5%
1980	3,018		20.4%
1990	3,266		8.2%
2000	3,589		9.9%
2010	3,545		−1.2%
2020	3,525		−0.6%
U.S. Decennial Census

As of the census, of 2000, there were 3,589 people, 1,387 households, and 1,049 families residing in the town. The population density was 81.5 inhabitants per square mile (31.5/km^{2}). There were 1,879 housing units at an average density of 42.7 per square mile (16.5/km^{2}). The racial makeup of the town was 98.30% White, 0.08% Black or African American, 0.00% Native American, 0.31% Asian, 0.06% Pacific Islander, 0.53% from other races, and 0.72% from two or more races. 1.06% of the population were Hispanic or Latino of any race.

There were 1,387 households, out of which 33.6% had children under the age of 18 living with them, 63.5% are Marriage, married couples living together, 8.4% had a female householder with no husband present, and 24.3% were non-families. Of all households 20.0% were made up of individuals, and 7.1% had someone living alone who was 65 years of age or older. The average household size was 2.59 and the average family size was 2.95.

In the town, the population was spread out, with 24.9% under the age of 18, 5.6% from 18 to 24, 28.8% from 25 to 44, 28.8% from 45 to 64, and 11.8% who were 65 years of age or older. The median age was 40 years. For every 100 females, there were 100.6 males. For every 100 females age 18 and over, there were 99.5 males.

The median income for a household in the town was $51,155, and the median income for a family was $54,119. Males had a median income of $38,827 versus $28,385 for females. The per capita income for the town was $23,425. Of the population, 6.0% and 5.3% of families were below the poverty line. Out of the total population, 9.6% of those under the age of 18 and 1.4% of those 65 and older were living below the poverty line.

== Education ==
Galway has its own school district, composed of pre-school through 12th grade. The elementary school is called Joseph Henry Elementary, the middle and high school are known as Galway Junior Senior High School as of 2011, although formerly known as Galway Middle School and Galway High School. The middle school was built in 1999. The growing population began the expansion of the middle school. A new high school was built in 1952 to replace the previous Galway Union Free School which had served for over half a century. Also, prior to 1952, Galway had many one-room school houses scattered throughout the town, many of which still exist.

== Communities and locations in the town ==
- Birchton: A hamlet in the southeastern corner of the town.
- Bunn Corners: A location near the western town boundary on County Road 45.
- East Galway: A hamlet in the northeastern corner of the town on NY-29. It was formerly called "Yorks Corners".
- Fairweather Corners: A hamlet west of Galway village on County Road 45.
- Galway: A village in the center of the town, located on NY-147 at County Road 45.
- Galway Lake: A 564-acre (2.3 km^{2}) privately owned lake in the western part of the town, currently permitting only electric powered or sail boats. The lake is a popular summer spot for the Galway Lake Camper's Association.
- Greens Corners: A hamlet at the northern town line.
- Holsapple Corners: A location near Galway village.
- Hooesville: A hamlet on the western town boundary.
- Jeffer's Grove: Located on the eastern side of Galway Lake, consisting of seasonal and year-round homes. Members have access to a shared beach association that they can join to access the largest beach on the lake.
- Kimballs Corners: A location east of North Galway.
- Maywood Grove: A seasonal and year-round community on the southern and western shores of Galway Lake.
- Mosherville: A hamlet in the northeastern part of the town, located on NY-29.
- North Galway: A hamlet north of Galway village, located on NY-29.
- O'Brien Corners: A location near Galway village.
- Parkis Mills: A hamlet northeast of Galway village.
- Ruback's Grove: A private community of camps and summer cottages. It has multiple beaches with lake access, a night time candy shop, pavilion, a basketball court, and volleyball court.
- South Galway Corner: A location near Birchton.
- Shuttleworth Corners: A location south of Galway village.
- Weissenbaker Grove: A seasonal and year-round community on the south shore of Galway Lake.
- West Galway: A hamlet on the western town boundary on County Road 45.
- Whitesides Corners: A hamlet on the northern town line.

== Notable people ==
- Francis Putnam Burns, piano maker
