= Galway sheep =

Breed of sheep

The Galway sheep is a breed of domestic sheep originating in County Galway, in the west of Ireland, based on the earlier Roscommon sheep of neighbouring County Roscommon. They are a large, polled, white-faced sheep, having a characteristic bob of wool on the head and legs. The outer lips are of a dark colour and dark spots on the ears are common. The average litter size is 1.45 in pedigree flocks. While a major proportion of ewes within the bred weigh 80–85 kg and have a litter size of 1.3, there is wide variation to be found. This breed is primarily raised for meat.

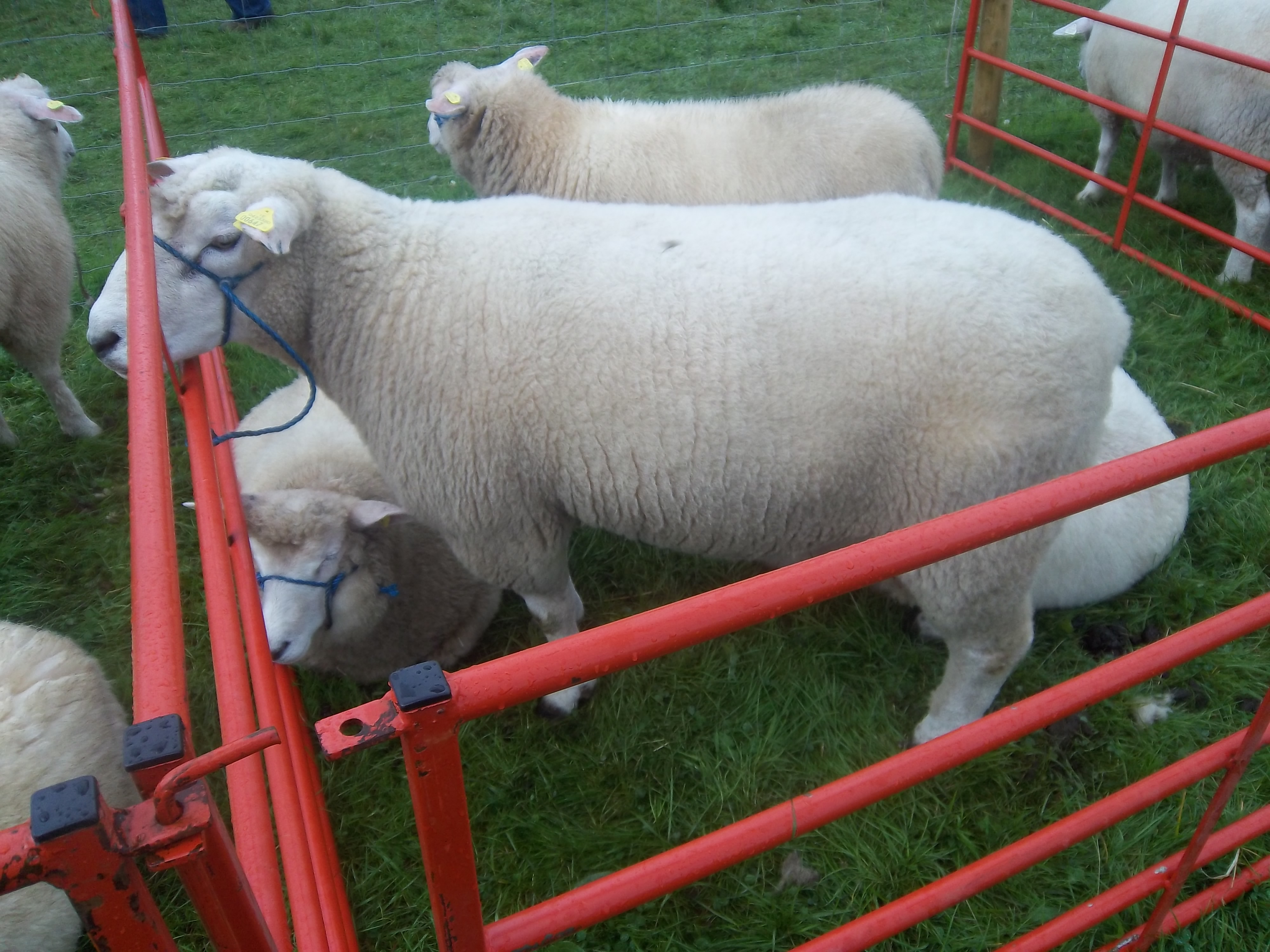
A Galway Ram at the Tullamore Show 2012

== History ==
The Galway breed was developed in the West of Ireland, as a result of the importation of English Longwools from the late 17th century onwards. From the middle of the 18th century, Robert Bakewell's Dishley Leicester, also known as the New or Improved Leicester, was exported to Ireland in large numbers, in particular to the estate of Bakewell's associate, Lord Roscommon, and later Lord Sheffield. The Galway is Ireland's only recognised native breed, and in 1999, there were less than 1000 true to type Galway sheep in 39 pedigree flocks (a dramatic increase from 14 breeders in 1990). The breed which developed was for many years known as the Roscommon, and a Flock Book of Roscommon Long-Wool Sheep was established in 1895, surviving until at least the 1920s. The Roscommon was a large, white-faced polled breed. Although these sheep were classified as Longwool, they did not have the very long staple characteristic of breeds such as the Lincoln and Leicester Longwool. It bore, as the modern Galway does, an almost uncanny resemblance to surviving prints and paintings of Bakewell's sheep, signifying it was perhaps more closely related to the Dishley breed than any of the English breeds which were influenced by Bakewell's stock.

In 1923, by which time the Roscommon breed society had vanished, a group of breeders in Galway founded the Galway Sheep Breeders Society at Athenry, and inspected over 6,000 ewes and 200 rams, presumably of Roscommon type, admitting 10% of these to the new register. The selection was probably for a slightly neater type of sheep than the old Roscommon.

In 1969, a recording scheme, was mainly aimed at improving profligacy, was started with the help of the Department of Agriculture and An Foras Taluntais (now Teagasc). Average litter size for 2 to 4 year old ewes in Irish pedigree flocks in 1999 was 1.62; the best flocks have achieved 2.0. The birth recording system now exists on www.sheep.ie and

Following representations to the Dept. of Agriculture by the Irish Genetic Resources Conservation Trust, the pedigree Galway is now included in the provisions of the Rural Environment Protection Scheme, and breeders in Ireland receive an additional subsidy payment. There are just a few hundred Galway ewes in the UK.

Galway Sheep are the only native rare breed officially recognised by Department of Agriculture Food and the Marine.

In 1999 there were less than 1000 true to type Galway sheep in 39 pedigree flocks (a big increase from the 14 breeders in 1990). Practically all the breeders are west of the Shannon.

It has been written that in the 1776-1779 period English breeds were not in great favour by the Irish and some of these sheep were actually killed (for political reasons). At one stage the Roscommon breed was in existence (a large Galway) and later the Galway was mentioned as a strain of the Roscommon. The Roscommon got both very high praise and severe criticism depending on the particular time and the critic. Certainly, the Roscommon would not have suitable for to-days markets. In 1969/70 the Dept. of Agriculture, with the help of the then Agricultural Institute, initiated a new Galway Breeding Scheme. The scheme is now long forgotten about as the ewes are not there to improve. Galway sheep were imported to England until the 1900s.
