= Songy =

- Commune
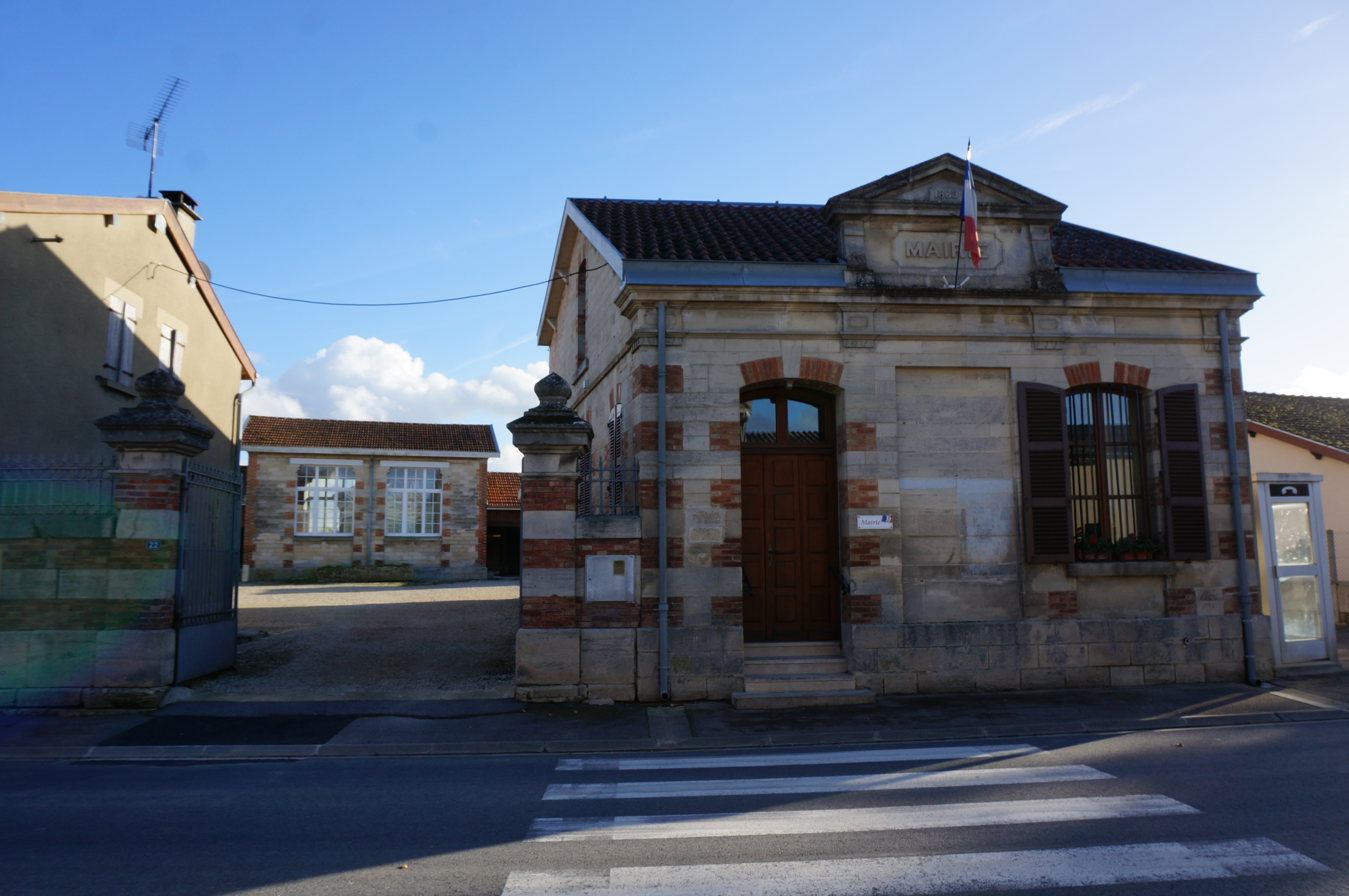
- The town hall in Songy

- Coat of arms
- Location of Songy
- Location within France Location within Grand Est
- Coordinates: 48°48′11″N 4°30′04″E
- Country: France
- Region: Grand Est
- Department: Marne
- Arrondissement: Vitry-le-François
- Canton: Vitry-le-François-Champagne et Der

Government
  - Mayor (2020–2026): Francis Passinhas
- Area^{1}: 15.06 km^{2} (5.81 sq mi)
- Elevation: 93 m (305 ft)
- Population (2023): 266
  - Density: 17.7/km^{2} (45.7/sq mi)
- Time zone: UTC+01:00 (CET)
  - Summer (DST): UTC+02:00 (CEST)
- INSEE/Postal code: 51552 /51240
- ^{1} French Land Register data, which excludes lakes, ponds, glaciers > 1 km^{2} (0.386 sq mi or 247 acres) and river estuaries.

Songy (French pronunciation: [sɔ̃ʒi]) is a commune in the Marne department in north-eastern France.

== The "wild girl of Songi" ==
In September, 1731 Marie Angélique, called the "wild girl of Songi" or the "wild girl of Champagne", was captured at Songy. Then, she spent some months in the castle of the Viscount d'Epinoy.

The castle of the Viscount d'Epinoy can still be seen today, and is close to the 12th-century church that remains in the village.

== See also ==
- Communes of the Marne department
