= An Introduction to Language =

Book by Victoria Fromkin, Robert Rodman, and Nina Hyams

- Author: Victoria Fromkin, Robert Rodman, Nina Hyams
- Language: English
- Subject: linguistics
- Genre: textbook
- Publisher: Thomson/Heinle
- Publication date: 1974 (1st ed), 2017 (11th ed)
- Media type: Print (hardcover)
- ISBN: 9781133310686

An Introduction to Language is a textbook by Victoria Fromkin, Robert Rodman, and Nina Hyams in which the authors provide an introduction to linguistics.

== Reception ==
The book was reviewed by Judith W. Lindfors, Adam Glaz and Geoffrey Horrocks. Peter Ladefoged calls it a "successful book" whose success lies in its clarity and the wide range of topics covered.
