= Robert Rodman =

American linguist

Robert Rodman (1940–2017) was a lifelong academic, serving on the faculty of the University of North Carolina and Duke University before becoming an associate professor of computer science at North Carolina State University in Raleigh, North Carolina. Rodman attended UCLA where he attained graduate degrees in mathematics linguistics. At UCLA, he met and later worked with linguist Victoria Fromkin and authored the bestselling linguistics textbook An Introduction to Language. He was also a novelist, his work published by Boson Books in Raleigh, North Carolina.

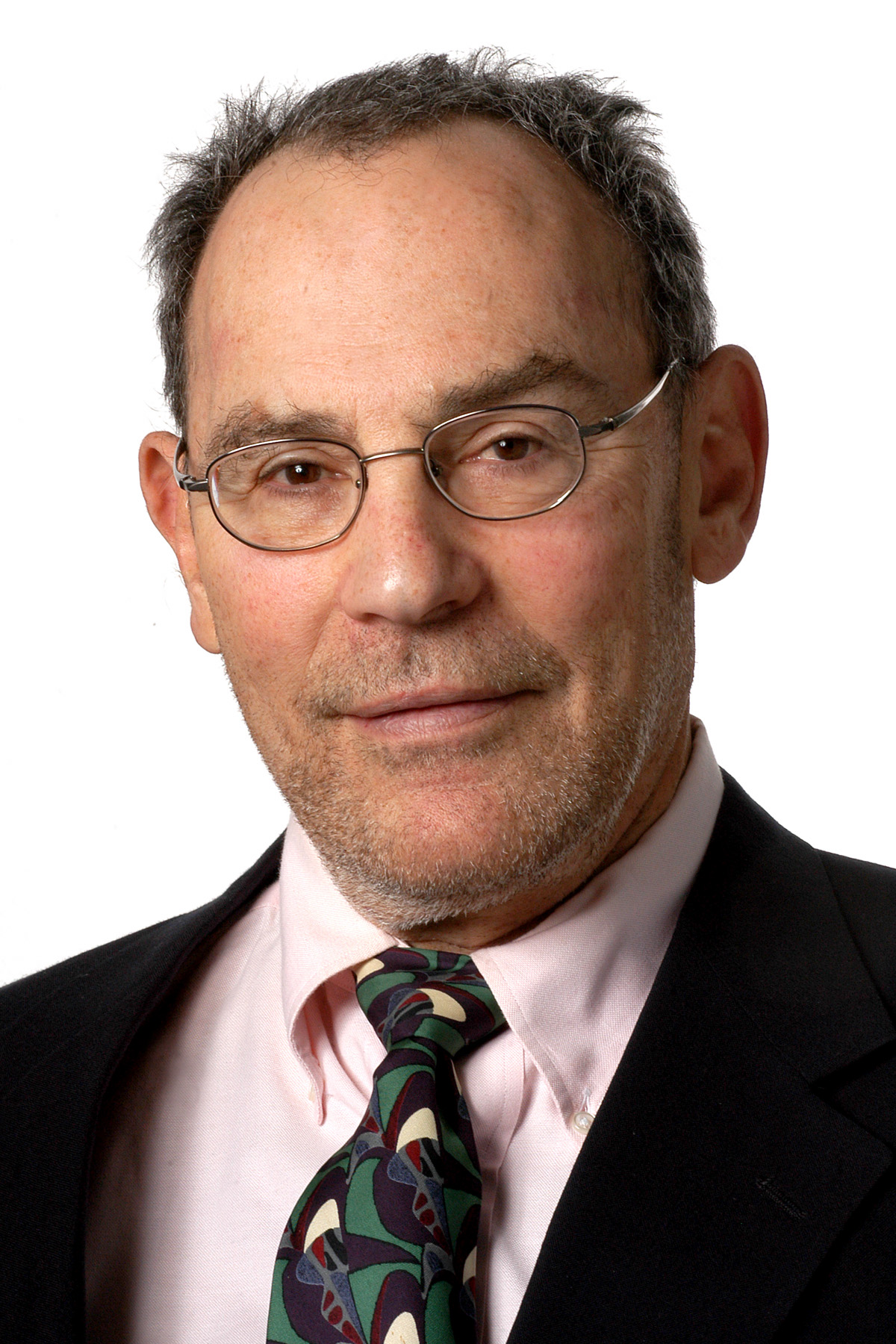
Robert D. Rodman

Dr. Rodman died on 15 January 2017 from complications related to inclusion body myositis.

== Bibliography ==
- Fromkin, V., Rodman, R., & Hyams, N. (2010). An Introduction to Language (9th ed.). Boston, MA: Thomson Wadsworth. ISBN 978-1428263925.
- Fromkin, V., Rodman, R., & Hyams, N. (2007). An Introduction to Language (8th ed.). Boston, MA: Thomson Wadsworth. ISBN 978-1-4130-1773-1.
- Rodman, R (2010). The Evil that Men Do. Raleigh, NC: Boson Books. ISBN 978-0917990809.
