= Mockingbird Don't Sing =

2001 film by Harry Bromley Davenport

- DVD cover
- Directed by: Harry Bromley Davenport
- Written by: Daryl Haney
- Produced by: Kris Murphy
- Starring: Tarra Steele; Melissa Errico; Sean Young; Kim Darby
- Cinematography: Jeff Baustert
- Music by: Mark Hart
- Distributed by: Mainline Releasing
- Release date: May 4, 2001
- Running time: 98 minutes
- Country: United States
- Language: English

Mockingbird Don't Sing is a 2001 American independent film based on the true story of Genie, a modern-day feral child. The film is told from the point of view of Susan Curtiss (whose fictitious name is Sandra Tannen), a professor of linguistics at University of California, Los Angeles. Although the film is based on a true story, all of the names are fictitious for legal reasons (e.g. the pseudonym "Genie" has been changed to "Katie"). The film was released to US theaters on May 4, 2001. It won first prize for best screenplay at the Rhode Island International Film Festival (tied with Wings of Hope).

== Plot ==
In Los Angeles, 1970, Katie Standon, a girl who has been imprisoned in her room (and without any human contact) since the age of one, is now thirteen years old. Her mother Louise, who has cataracts, has taken enough abuse from her domineering husband Wes; she gets her son, Billy, a few years older than Katie, to help her and Katie escape their home.

At a welfare office a social worker notices something peculiar about Katie and guesses her age to be about seven while, in fact, she is thirteen. Katie is taken to Children's Hospital, and Louise and Wes find themselves being arrested for "what authorities are calling the worst case of child abuse they've ever seen". Shortly before his trial begins, Wes kills himself. The doctors and psycholinguists investigating the case form the "Katie Team", a group of experts dedicated to helping Katie learn to speak and interact with others. One of the team members, Judy Bingham, a special education teacher, sees Katie as a pawn whom she can use to attain international fame. She claims Katie will make her "the next Anne Sullivan." University of California, Los Angeles (UCLA) graduate student Sandra Tannen is one of the people who appear to have Katie's welfare at heart.

Katie comes to live with Dr. Norman Glazer who works at Children's Hospital, and his family, where she stays for four years. His family helps Katie become a civilized human being. Although Katie shows outstanding progress in some things (such as learning vocabulary words and sign language, preparing hygiene, showing off anger, and certain other activities), she never really learns grammatical structure. Meanwhile, Louise has surgery to remove her cataracts and visits Katie off and on.

When Katie turns eighteen, the funding for her help is cut off and she returns to Louise's care. Soon, it comes to the point where Louise does not know how to handle Katie herself and Katie gets placed in another foster home. One day, Katie is physically abused for vomiting and responds by never eating or speaking because she was afraid if she opened her mouth she would vomit again and face more abuse.

Sandra does all that she can to make sure that Katie is handled in the proper way and even has Norman help her. Katie is taken back to Children's Hospital, and Sandra is suggested by social services to have Katie live with her. Before any decisions are made about this, Louise takes Katie out of the hospital and puts her in another foster home. Sandra is not allowed to say goodbye to Katie. Louise even threatens to take legal action on Sandra if she ever sees Katie again.

Sandra finally asks Louise why Katie was placed in extreme isolation before her discovery. Louise tells the entire story; Wes loved his mother very much, and when she died due to an accident, he projected his feelings for her onto Katie. After a doctor examined Katie sometime later, she was diagnosed as intellectually disabled and Wes locked her up, afraid that the doctors might take her away, and because Louise was starting to go blind, Wes took care of Katie.

Sandra then leaves the house, running into Judy again. It is now clear that she knew Louise for a long time. Sandra and Judy have a quick argument, after which Judy enters Louise's house, leaving Sandra crying. At this point, different kinds of footage of Katie appear on screen; Sandra looks at tape recordings of Katie on her TV. She then is seen writing something on a typewriter, while her voice addresses the viewers; she's hoping to see Katie once more. The camera then turns to her and her boyfriend, now holding a baby of their own. The screen fades while she sings the "Hush, Little Baby" lullaby. The screen fades, and footage of Katie on the beach can be seen.

Messages appear, saying what has happened to everyone after the movie: Judy continues to harass the "Katie Team" until her death in 1988; Louise, who is now once again blind, resides in a nursing home in Southern California; Sandra Tannen is now a professor of linguistics at UCLA and has two teenage daughters, however, she is still not allowed to have any contact with Katie, who lives in a foster home nearby. The last message before the screen turns black and the credits appear, reads: "Katie's inability to learn a language proved the legitimacy of the Critical Period Hypothesis".

== Cast ==
Actor	Role	Real life counterpart
Tarra Steele	Katie Standon	Genie (pseudonym)
Melissa Errico	Sandra Tannen	Susan Curtiss
Kim Darby	Louise Standon	Genie's mother
Joe Regalbuto	Dr. Norman Glazer	David Rigler
Sean Young	Dr. Judy Bingham	Jean Butler (Ruch)
Michael Lerner	Dr. Stan York	James Kent
Laurie O'Brien	Beverly Glazer	Marilyn Rigler
Jack Betts	Wes Standon	Genie's father
John Valdetero	Wayne Lacy	Jay Shurley
Michael Azria	Billy Standon	Genie's brother
Rachel Grate	Jill	Genie's foster sister
