= Linguistic development of Genie =

Case study

When the circumstances of Genie, the primary victim in one of the most severe cases of abuse, neglect and social isolation on record in medical literature, first became known in early November 1970, authorities arranged for her admission to Children's Hospital Los Angeles, where doctors determined that at the age of 13 years and 7 months, she had not acquired a first language. Hospital staff then began teaching Genie to speak General American English, which she gradually began to learn and use. Their efforts soon caught the attention of linguists, who saw her as an important way to gain further insight into acquisition of language skills and linguistic development. Starting in late May 1971, UCLA professor Victoria Fromkin headed a team of linguists who began a detailed case study on Genie. One of Fromkin's graduate students, Susan Curtiss, became especially involved in testing and recording Genie's linguistic development. Linguists' observations of Genie began that month, and in October of that year they began actively testing what principles of language she had acquired and was acquiring. Their studies enabled them to publish several academic works examining theories and hypotheses regarding the proposed critical period during which humans learn to understand and use language.

On broader levels, Genie followed some normal patterns of young children acquiring a first language, but researchers noted many marked differences with her linguistic development. The size of her vocabulary and the speed with which she expanded it consistently outstripped anticipations, and many of the earliest words she learned and used were very different from typical first-language learners and strongly indicated that she possessed highly developed cognitive abilities. By contrast, she had far more difficulty acquiring and using grammar. She clearly mastered some basic aspects of grammar, and understood significantly more than she used in her speech, but her rate of grammar acquisition was much slower than normal. As a result, her vocabulary was consistently much more advanced and sophisticated than most people in equivalent phases of learning grammar. Researchers attributed some of her abnormal expressive language to physical difficulties with speech production, the result of her having been punished for making any sounds as a child, and worked very hard to improve her ability to speak. Within months of being discovered Genie developed exceptional nonverbal communication skills and became capable of using several methods of nonverbal communication to compensate for her lack of language, so researchers decided to also teach her a form of sign language.

By the time scientists finished working with Genie, she had not fully mastered English grammar and her rate of acquisition had significantly slowed down. Linguists ultimately concluded that because Genie had not learned a first language before the critical period had ended, she was unable to fully acquire a language. Furthermore, despite the clear improvements in her conversational competence it remained very low, and the quality of her speech production remained highly atypical. While she had expanded her use of language to serve a wider range of functions, she had an unusually difficult time using it during social interactions. Tests on Genie's brain found she was acquiring language in the right hemisphere of her brain despite being right-handed, giving rise to many new hypotheses and refining existing hypotheses on cerebral lateralization and its effect on linguistic development.

Testing of Genie's language occurred until the end of 1977, but in mid-1975, when she was 18 years old, authorities placed her in a foster care setting which subjected her to extreme physical and emotional abuse, causing her to become afraid to speak and to rapidly begin losing her newly acquired language skills. After removal from this location in April 1977, she moved through several more placements, some of which were highly abusive, causing further regression of her language skills. In early January 1978, Genie's mother suddenly decided to prevent any further testing and scientific observations of Genie, and the very little available information on her ability to communicate since that time is exclusively from personal observations or secondary accounts of them. Nonetheless, linguists have continued analyzing Genie's language long after this time. Since the case study on Genie ended, there has been some controversy and debate among linguists about how much grammar she had acquired and for how long she had been learning new aspects of language.

== Background ==
Genie was the last, and second surviving, of four children of parents living in Arcadia, California, and was born in 1957 without any noted complications at a normal weight and size; the following day she showed signs of Rh incompatibility and required a blood transfusion, but had no sequelae and was otherwise described as healthy. Her mother was almost entirely blind by this time, and around the time of her birth her father began to isolate himself and his family from other people. Due to treatment for a congenital hip dislocation, which required her to wear a highly restrictive Frejka splint from the age of 4 1/2 to 11 months, she was late to walk, causing her father to decide that she was severely mentally retarded. His view intensified as she got older, and consequently he disliked her. He therefore tried not to talk to or pay attention to her and discouraged his wife and son, who was five years older than Genie, from doing so.

Doctors and scientists who later worked with Genie were uncertain about most of her life from birth to 20 months. Besides her hip dislocation, the few medical records from the first year of her life noted no physical or mental abnormalities, but by the age of 11 months she was falling behind in her physical development, which researchers believed was due to both malnutrition and some degree of neglect. In conversations with members of the research team that studied Genie, her mother said that as a baby, Genie was not very cuddly and did not babble very much. At times she claimed that at an undetermined point, Genie said some unspecified individual words, but on other occasions said that Genie never produced speech of any kind, preventing linguists from making any definitive determinations. When Genie was 20 months old, after a pickup truck struck and killed her paternal grandmother, Genie's father decided to increase the family's isolation as much as possible, and because he thought Genie was severely retarded he believed she required a higher degree of isolation than the rest of the family.

Genie spent almost all of her childhood locked alone in a bedroom with almost no environmental stimuli, where her father left her severely malnourished and almost always kept her either strapped to a child's toilet or bound inside a crib with her arms and legs completely immobilized. He refused to speak to or to be around her, beating her with a plank he kept in her room if she made any sound or showed any emotion, and to discourage her from making any outward expression he would bare his teeth and bark and growl at her like a dog while scratching her. As a result, she learned not to vocalize or make noise and to remain as unexpressive as possible. On some occasions when she was hungry or seeking some kind of attention she made environmental noises, but otherwise maintained silence at all times.

Genie's father had an extremely low tolerance for any kind of noise, refusing to have a working television or radio in the house. Apart from one slightly open window, Genie did not have any access to auditory stimuli outside the house, and the window was set well away from the street and other houses, so what little she heard from outside almost exclusively consisted of environmental sounds. Her father never allowed other people in the house, only permitted his wife to be in Genie's presence for a few minutes each day—and even during these times would not let her interact with Genie in any way—and forced his son to assist with carrying out his abuse while otherwise forbidding him from being with Genie. He did not let his wife or son speak, and especially not to or around Genie, so any conversations they had were out of Genie's earshot, preventing her from hearing any meaningful amount of language.

Sometime during October 1970, Genie's mother left her husband and took Genie with her. A few weeks later, on November 4, Genie's mother inadvertently entered a social services office, where a social worker observed Genie's behavior and total silence. The social worker and her supervisor brought Genie to the attention of child welfare authorities and the police, and a court order was immediately issued for Genie, who was 13 years and 7 months old, to be admitted to Children's Hospital Los Angeles. The police officer who arrested Genie's parents said that he and other authorities who interacted with Genie specifically noted that she did not speak.

== Initial assessment ==
Immediately upon Genie's admission to Children's Hospital, Howard Hansen, who was the head of the hospital's psychiatry division and an early expert on child abuse, and David Rigler, a therapist and USC pediatrics and psychology professor who was the chief psychologist at the hospital, took direct control of her care. The following day they assigned physician James Kent, another early advocate for child abuse awareness, to be her primary therapist. Early tests placed her estimated mental age at approximately a 13-month-old level, within the range of development when the earliest phases of language acquisition begin. Audiometry tests confirmed Genie had regular hearing in both ears, doctors found no physical or mental deficiencies explaining her lack of speech, and her few existing medical records did not contain any definitive diagnoses. Based on a series of daytime observations and sleep studies that Jay Shurley, a professor of psychiatry and behavioral sciences at the University of Oklahoma, and a specialist in extreme social isolation conducted in the first 18 months after her admission, doctors definitively ruled out the possibility that Genie was autistic or had any brain damage.

From the time of Genie's admission, doctors saw she clearly picked up some nonverbal information, with Kent emphasizing that she seemed very intent on looking at peoples' faces and made decent eye contact, further noting that she showed a small amount of responsiveness to it even in the absence of language. Despite this, Kent noted that she could only get across a few very basic needs, and neither made facial expressions nor used any discernible body language. When Genie was upset she would engage in silent, expressionless, self-harming tantrums until she had physically tired herself out, after which she immediately reverted to being completely non-expressive. She never cried during these outbursts—according to several firsthand accounts she could not cry at all—and if she wanted to make noise she pushed chairs or other objects. On a few occasions she responded to stimuli with a very soft, high-pitched, shrill laugh, but was otherwise completely undemonstrative.

Kent's early notes on Genie contained little linguistic information, which linguists wrote demonstrated Genie's unresponsiveness to language. Kent observed that she seemed interested in other people talking and attentively looked at the mouth of a speaker, but had almost no reaction to speech. She seemed to recognize only a very few words which she always reacted to as if she heard them in isolation, and was entirely unable to respond to very basic sentences or commands without non-linguistic information. Hospital staff initially thought she understood them based on her few responses, but later determined she was reacting to accompanying nonverbal signals. She almost never tried to speak, and Kent described her few vocalizations as, "a kind of throaty whimper." Because she had been forced to repress all vocalization during infancy and childhood, her larynx and vocal tract were extremely underused and the muscles used for speech production were severely atrophied, which doctors believed made it difficult for her to control both air flow and her vocal cords.

From tapes and doctors' notes of Genie's first two months in the hospital, linguists later discerned that by January 1971, she knew her own name, the words mother and father, the four color words red, blue, green, and brown, the words no and sorry, and a few miscellaneous nouns such as jewelry box, door, and bunny. She also appeared to understand negative commands, and accordingly could discern a warning using a negation, although whether she understood them in the context of sentences was unclear. (Note: For instance, in a tape from November 23rd Genie followed Kent's instructions when he handed her a rattle and told her, "Don't let the bunny get that rattle!" before trying to take it with a puppet of a rabbit. Kent told linguists that he was unsure of whether he had played that game with her before, leading them to believe Genie might have acted solely based on her understanding the negative command and the words bunny and rattle.) There was speculation, though no conclusive evidence, that she understood the intonation to indicate a yes or no question and that she understood imperative mood sentences based on tone of voice, but she otherwise lacked any grammar. Her active vocabulary at that time appeared to consist of just two short phrases, "stop it" and "no more", both of which she treated as individual words. Some doctors thought she may have spontaneously said a few other words or negative commands, as her very few vocalizations were extremely difficult to understand, but there was no record of them and no one could remember what they might have been. Linguists could not determine the extent of her expressive or receptive vocabulary at any point before then, and therefore did not know whether she acquired any or all of this language during the preceding two months at the hospital.

Genie's comprehension and production of these few words demonstrated that she distinguished speech from other environmental sounds and could hear individual phonemes when listening to people talking, two critical early components of language acquisition. Nonetheless, based on their observations both Children's Hospital doctors and the linguists who later worked with her concluded that she had not acquired a first language during childhood. Due to the lack of physical or mental explanations for her lack of speech, Kent and Hansen attributed it to the extreme isolation of her childhood. Kent came away from his first encounters with Genie extremely pessimistic about her prognosis on all fronts.

== Early communication progress ==
Children's Hospital staff did not keep detailed records of Genie's early linguistic progress, and she only rarely spoke in the first 6 months of her stay, so there was little data on Genie's language during this time. When Kent met with Genie for the first time, he initially observed no visible reactions from her but eventually found that she seemed afraid of a small puppet. When she threw it on the floor Kent pretended to be concerned and said, "We have to get him back", and was startled when she repeated the word "back" and nervously laughed. When they subsequently played with the puppet together she repeated "back" several times, and when Kent said, "The puppet will fall" she repeated the word "fall". Apart from her tantrums, the times she played with this and similar puppets accounted for most of the few instances she made any outward expression during the early part of her stay.

Within weeks of being admitted to Children's Hospital, Genie became much more responsive to nonverbal stimuli, although at first her own demeanor remained devoid of nonverbal signals. During the first months that she lived at the hospital, she gradually began to express more of her emotions outward. After a fairly short time, Genie's nonverbal communication skills became exceptional. Everyone who worked with her said she had an indescribable way of eliciting emotions, and she seemed able to communicate her desires without talking.

Genie's early receptive and expressive vocabulary acquisition was slow, although from the outset people observing her believed her linguistic performance was significantly behind her linguistic competence. Within a month, she became far more responsive to other people talking, but doctors were unsure whether she was responding more to verbal or nonverbal stimuli. After a month, she started attempting to mimic speech, albeit very infrequently, and soon after hospital staff observed her saying "stopit", which she treated as one word, as a phrase of ritual play. Even at this phase she distinguished the names of similar objects, even if they were unfamiliar, but never overgeneralized words for individual objects. If she encountered something unfamiliar, she always sought the correct word or phrase instead of attempting to apply a word from her existing vocabulary, and could determine the names of objects based on their uses.

Psychologists Jack Block and Jeanne Block evaluated Genie in February 1971, and put her language below the two-year-old level on the Vineland Adaptive Behavior Scale. During the next month her vocabulary acquisition began to accelerate at a progressively more rapid pace, with observers putting her active vocabulary at over 100 words. Doctors noted that she seemed to know far more words than she would spontaneously say, but could not be sure about the extent of either her receptive or expressive vocabulary because she was so responsive to nonverbal stimuli. After another month, Genie began spontaneously producing one-word utterances and began to understand increasingly complex sentences. Soon after she appeared to understand some basic elements of the give-and-take nature of conversation, and without prompting could provide non-imitative one-word responses to statements or questions.

By May 1971, most of Genie's vocabulary consisted of words for colors, the numbers 1 through 5, the word "mama", the names of a few people, the verbs "stop it" and "spit", and a large number of miscellaneous nouns. She also knew a few compound verbs, such as put back, although she treated them as single words in her vocabulary, and learned few stative verbs within the typical time frame of language acquisition. Whereas children's vocabulary primarily consists of nouns and a few particles, Genie's early lexicon contained almost as many adjectives and verbs as nouns, and unlike most children she used entire phrases as labels, only doing so with single words if asked. Before she began forming two-word sentences, she could both ask for something and associate an object with someone, which was normal, but unlike most children she could also ask about memories or future events which had previously been mentioned. In late May 1971 with Jean Butler, her teacher at the hospital, Genie showed comprehension of basic commands.

Genie had very little control of her voice during this time. Her vocalizations were completely monotonic, abnormally high-pitched, and very soft, with many of her early utterances totally silent and others so quiet that they sounded like whispers. Throughout 1971 her voice was extremely glottalized, and when she spoke she frequently pronounced only a few sounds; for instance, the word "doctor" sounded more like "dert". Despite knowing how to ask questions, she could only indicate them through facial expressions. Additionally, in spite of the lack of variability in her own voice, she clearly understood different tones of voice in other peoples' speech.

Like most young children, Genie's first words were monosyllabic consonant-vowel-(consonant) sequences, usually consisting of an unaspirated bilabial stop or dental stop and a monophthong. But while most children's first disyllabic words also follow this pattern, hers had both consonant-vowel and vowel-consonant sequences. Unusually, from the very first disyllabic words Genie more fully articulated, except when referring to herself by her (real) name, she immediately demonstrated proper stress patterns. For approximately two years the length of time she held out a vowel was her only stress indicator, and during that time this was very exaggerated. People unfamiliar with her speech said she sounded either like a deaf child or someone with cerebral palsy, although trained speech pathologists only said the latter.

=== Early research team observations ===
In December 1970 David Rigler procured a small grant from the National Institute of Mental Health (NIMH) to conduct preliminary studies on Genie, and in May 1971 Rigler organized and headed a team of doctors and scientists who sought and obtained a three-year grant from the NIMH to carry out a full case study. The primary focus of their research was to test the hypothesis of Eric Lenneberg that humans have a critical period for language acquisition, the end of which he defined as the onset of puberty, and the innateness hypothesis of Noam Chomsky, which contended that the ability to learn language is instinctive in humans and is what separates humans from all other animals. UCLA linguistics professor Victoria Fromkin headed linguistic evaluation and organized a group of linguists to design and carry out their study. Shortly afterwards, in late May, Susan Curtiss began her work on Genie's case as a graduate student in linguistics under Fromkin. (Note: Lenneberg stated that he did not have any desire to study Genie and declined to participate, saying no definite conclusions could be drawn because the level of trauma associated with Genie's childhood would be impossible to discern.)

The relative lack of linguistic information on Genie from the previous six months left some ambiguities about the rate and timeline of Genie's early vocabulary and grammar acquisition. Curtiss and Fromkin quickly decided that Genie's linguistic abilities were not yet at a usefully testable level, so for the rest of Genie's stay at Children's Hospital Curtiss met with her almost every day for observations. They soon realized existing linguistic tests would not yield meaningful results, so although they also incorporated a few existing tests, including the Peabody Picture Vocabulary Test, into their exams, they designed a set of 26 new tests from which they extrapolated most of their data. Curtiss also wrote down every spontaneous utterance she heard from Genie, ultimately recording approximately a few thousand.

Curtiss quickly recognized Genie's nonverbal communication abilities, recalling several nonverbal interactions Genie had with strangers during that time. By this time, Genie could name most of the things around her and had an estimated vocabulary of at least a few hundred words, consisting of a few verbs and adjectives and a large number of nouns. She was also extremely eager to expand her vocabulary, frequently grabbing Curtiss' hand and pointing it towards objects for which she wanted to know the word, and if Curtiss could not figure out exactly what Genie was looking for Genie refused to let go until she learned at least one new word. Curtiss noted Genie's focus on objective properties, and especially her knowledge of color words, was very unusual because these require a level of cognitive sophistication not present in young children, suggesting she developed mental mechanisms for categorization during childhood. She had also clearly learned some basic principles of grammar, and understood more than she was producing.

In early June 1971, Genie began to use her first words with two morphemes and constructed her earliest two-word sentences, all of which were modifier-noun or noun-noun attributive constructions such as "More soup" or "Genie purse". A short time later, she began to produce noun-predicate adjective sentences such as "Dave sick". During this time, she never used equational sentences characteristic of young children in this phase of development. In addition, while most children form early two-word sentences with a few core words, which they attach to a wider variety of words, Curtiss never observed Genie doing this.

== First foster home ==
In late June 1971, Genie moved into Jean Butler's home, where she stayed until early August. Butler was childless, and at the time lived alone. Soon after moving in with Butler, Genie, who had turned 14 while living at Children's Hospital, showed the first signs of reaching puberty, definitively putting her past Lenneberg's proposed critical period. The only linguistic information from anyone besides Butler during Genie's stay was that Genie formed some non-imitative two-word utterances in July, all without verbs and in noun phrase–noun phrase form, and that she gave her first imitations of a few unspecified three-word utterances.

Butler wrote that Genie rapidly became far more verbal and that the man she was dating, who moved in with her during Genie's stay and was a well known psychologist and retired University of Southern California professor, commented on Genie's talkativeness. She specifically claimed that she taught Genie to say "yes" to other people, to use negative word forms, and to express her anger through words or by hitting objects. Butler said Genie argued with her in late July and used negatives in her protestations, the first report of Genie using negatives in a sentence and of expressing disagreement in language. In an early August letter to Jay Shurley, Butler wrote that Genie regularly used two-word sentences and sometimes produced three-word utterances, giving "one black kitty" as an example, containing two adjacent adjectives to describe nouns, and that in a recent conversation Genie extensively used negative words and sentences. Butler also reported that a few days prior, when she asked Genie why she threw her new pet goldfish outside, Genie explained, "bad orange fish—no eat—bad fish", which would have been by far her longest utterance to that point.

== August 1971–mid-1975 ==
In mid-August 1971, authorities removed Genie from Butler's house and returned her to Children's Hospital. Later the same day they transferred her to David Rigler's home, where she stayed for approximately four years. The Riglers had three adolescent children, one of whom left for college shortly after Genie arrived. For the duration of Genie's stay Rigler's wife, Marilyn, was her teacher; Marilyn had graduate training as a social worker and had just completed a graduate degree in human development, and had previously worked in both nursery schools and Head Start Programs. Immediately after Genie moved in with the Riglers, linguists resumed detailed observations.

=== Brain exams ===
Beginning in January 1971, scientists administered a series of neurolinguistics tests on Genie, making her the first language-deprived child to undergo any detailed brain examinations. Based on tests and observations in everyday situations doctors concluded that she was right-handed, and that her brain was extremely right-hemisphere dominant for all functions. On tests specifically measuring Genie's language, her results were congruous with adult split-brain and left hemispherectomy patients. On a tachistoscopic test in 1975, Genie had little difficulty when asked to point to words which rhyme. Genie also did very well on one evoked response test involving familiar homophones, demonstrating that, similar to these patients, her receptive language comprehension was significantly better than her expressive capacity. An EEG consistently picked up more activity from her right hemisphere than they did from the normal locations of the Broca's area and Wernicke's area in a right-handed person, especially finding a high level of involvement from her right anterior cerebral cortex.

Based on these results the concluded that Genie's brain had completed lateralization and that, because Genie had received no stimulation in her language center when she was a child, it had atrophied and her language functions had instead lateralized to her right hemisphere. Her results on their non-language tests were normal for a right-handed person and caused the research team to conclude that her hemispheric dominance was not simply reversed for language. They believed that Genie had been developing as a normal right-handed person until the time her father began isolating her, and attributed the extreme imbalance between Genie's left and right hemispheres to the fact that Genie's sensory stimulation as a child was almost exclusively visual and tactile. Previous observations of right-hemisphere language acquisition in adult split-brain and left hemispherectomy patients consistently showed that both populations were much better at learning vocabulary, although they were able to learn some basic grammar. Linguists noted these subjects had an advantage over Genie because, unlike her, their right hemispheres had already acquired at least a small amount of basic language.

=== Before testing ===
When Genie first moved in with the Riglers, she still scratched and cut herself when angry, and researchers wrote that her speech was much more halting and hesitant than Butler had described. She infrequently spoke, and for reasons they could not discern she almost always had a several minute delay in her responses to speech. Usually she did not seem to listen to anyone unless she was being directly addressed, and she typically walked away from somebody who was speaking to her. While she would stay with someone if specifically asked, she rarely seemed attuned to what the person was saying. In contrast to Butler's writings the scientists wrote that Genie only rarely used two-word sentences, and prior to October 1971 they were all modifier-noun sentences, sentences indicating possession—none containing the possessive 's marker—or the two words of a compound noun such as "number five". For the first few months linguists did not record any utterances longer than two words, and wrote that she did not use any negative sentences.

Marilyn taught Genie to take her frustration out on inanimate objects in their yard and worked to verbally deescalate her, and as Genie learned more language she began to gain more control over her responses to situations that upset her. By the end of her stay with the Riglers she could gesture to indicate her level of anger, either vigorously shaking one finger or loosely waving her hand depending on whether she was very angry or merely frustrated. In mid-October 1971, Curtiss was reading Genie a story when she saw Genie was clearly listening and responding, and from then on Curtiss wrote that Genie paid attention to people talking even when they were not speaking directly to or about her. As she settled down with the Riglers she began to talk somewhat more, and her response time began to improve, but she continued to speak significantly less than most children in similar phases of language learning.

During this time the scientists observed that, unlike young children, Genie would never use any piece of grammar before complete comprehension. She also never spoke with the excessive specificity and overly marked words, such as "tooked", that are characteristic of people in this phase of language acquisition. Furthermore, whereas children typically begin to use two-word phrases when their vocabulary is about 50 words, Genie only began to do so after she could use and understand about 200, matching the timeline previously observed in children with various types of aphasia. Curtiss also noted that Genie used the word dog to describe any dog but not other animals, indicating she understood how to use generic terms, and that upon learning the name of the Riglers' dog she recognized that name was specific to him. In 1978, language psychologist Susan Goldin-Meadow suggested Genie's lack of overgeneralization may have been due to differences between the mind of a young child versus an adolescent as opposed to the properties of early language acquisition. She also had many more action verbs than normal in her early vocabulary.

At first, Genie did not use negative word forms but soon showed comprehension of them, an ability previously observed in split-brain and adult left-hemispherectomy patients, albeit much more consistently with the word not and contraction n't than the prefix un. Instead of learning negatives through the three-step process which linguists believed young children did, she appeared to have learned every kind of negation at once. In September 1971, she began incorporating verbs into her two-word utterances, such as, "Dave hurt", although at first she never included the first person subject and inconsistently included any subject. Although Genie's two-word sentences contained grammatical properties typical of young children she was much better at labeling and describing emotions and concrete objects, especially colors, sizes, and qualities, and most of her earliest two-word sentences modified nouns. Taken with her distinction between general and subordinate terms, this strongly indicated a focus on physical characteristics to a degree not seen in most children.

=== During testing ===
Curtiss began active testing of Genie's language in October 1971, when she and Fromkin decided her linguistic abilities had advanced to the point where they would yield usable results. Their tests measured both Genie's vocabulary and her acquisition of various aspects of grammar, including syntax, phonology, and morphology, and Curtiss conducted the primary analysis of the results. At first the tests were deliberately short, only looking for six to eight responses per test, and over the course of testing they gradually increased in duration. When Curtiss began testing, Genie usually did not actively resist but never initiated tests and only did the absolute least amount required, which Curtiss attributed to Genie simply being lazy, making the first year of testing extremely difficult. As Curtiss continued Genie grew to largely enjoy being tested and was typically much more willing to participate, though she still usually continued to less than she was capable of and sometimes playfully gave deliberately wrong answers, and on some occasions would even indicate that she wanted to take the tests.

==== 1971–1973: Early testing ====
Selected utterances
Utterance	Date	Notes	Curtiss' gloss (if any)
Dave hurt.	October 1971	Subject-verb	N/A
Stocking white.	November 1971	Noun-predicate	N/A
Mark mouth hurt.	November 1971	Three-word sentence	N/A
Play kitchen.	February 1972	Locative sentence	Play in kitchen.
Cow tongue meat.	July 1972	Complex noun phrase	A cow's tongue is meat.
Want go shopping.	July 1972	Expanded verb phrase	N/A
No more father.	July 1972	Stage One negative sentence	N/A
Want go walk Ralph.	October 1972	Complex noun phrase, more complex verb phrase	I want to walk to Ralph's.
Get out baby buggy!	Early 1973	Vocative case	N/A
Judy my finger caught door.	February 1973	Complex sentence	Judy caught her finger in the door.

Upon commencing her tests, Curtiss found that although Genie's comprehension was clearly ahead of her production, it was only slightly ahead. Genie had begun to diversify her two-word utterances to include sentences in either subject-verb or verb-object order, suggesting she was grasping the subject–verb–object sentence structure typically used in English, and could follow other basic word order rules as evidenced in her verb-complement sentences. While Genie did not use plural forms of words and could not distinguish between plural and singular words or inflections, by October 1971 she clearly distinguished between one versus more than one object and understood numbers and quantitative descriptors. She also started using some regular past tense forms of weak verbs. On tests, she consistently did better recognizing and responding to the conjugations of irregular past tense verbs and strong verbs, but she only started to use these forms, either in imitation or in spontaneous speech, in 1973, and they remained limited.

In a conference presentation during 1972, Fromkin said that by November 1971 Genie's speech was, "strictly rule-governed", and that her grammar at that time was similar to a typical 18- to 20-month-old. In November 1971 Genie began forming noun-predicate two-word utterances, such as "stocking white". Genie had also begun using the genitive case in some of her two-word sentences around this time, with many of these sentences, such as "Marilyn bike", indicating possession. In all of these early possessive sentences, she entirely relied on word order.

November 1971 was also the time that Genie produced her first spontaneous three- to four-word utterances, although they were extremely uncommon at first. All were either modifier–noun sentences such as "little white clear box", subject–verb–object sentences in noun–verb–noun form such as "Tori chew glove", or verb–noun phrase sentences, and some, such as "Small two cup", clearly demonstrated these were not imitations. In them, she used grammar which the scientists thought she knew but could not previously confirm, including the first-person subject in sentences such as "Genie love Curtiss", and could incorporate what would have been a modifier-noun or possessive utterance into a longer sentence, further convincing linguists that she understood subject–verb–object word order. (Note: Curtiss wrote that Genie referred to her by her last name.) Some utterances from this time until the end of 1973, such as "Elevator hurt silly goose", were completely unintelligible, and a few of these, such as "Angry burn stove", were subject–subject–subject sentences previously observed in children with various language disorders. Whereas most children progress beyond two-word sentences after four to six weeks, it took Genie five months to do so.

On tests between November 1971 and May 1972, Curtiss determined that Genie viewed non-specific adjectives describing size, such as little as absolute rather than relative values without superlative or comparative markers. Between January and May 1972, her comprehension of noun-modifier sentences significantly increased and starting in May 1972, after Curtiss replaced the word little with tiny, Genie showed clear comprehension of them. Genie clearly understood both the word more and the suffix -er as comparatives by January 1972, but never used them in her own speech. Prior to 1972, Genie responded to the conjunctions and and or as if they both meant and, but even after recognizing there was a difference never fully grasped the meaning of or. On tests she showed perfect comprehension of and while correctly responding to the word or fewer than 10% of the time, but she always understood disjunction marked by the word or in everyday conversation. She never attempted to use any other conjunctions, and with one possible highly ungrammatical exception never tried to connect two sentences.

Before December 1971, Genie could only use one noun in a sentence, but beginning in early 1972 Genie could form increasingly complex noun phrases. In early 1972, Genie began combining verbs to form two-word verbs in her sentences; most of these were two-word utterances requesting an action, such as "Leave on", but at least once in early November 1973 she included a two-word verb in part of a longer sentence. (Note: Curtiss distinguished these from previous two-word verbs because Genie had treated the earlier verbs as one word.) She also began using two consecutive verbs in some of her three and four-word utterances. By this time she could also use two-word noun phrases, such as "piece wood", in different contexts, but a later analysis by linguist Derek Bickerton speculated that she treated all of these as single words in her vocabulary. Genie's first locative sentences also appeared around this time, all of which were two or three words, always in either noun-noun or verb-noun form with one of the nouns being a locative noun, and contained no prepositions, and the scientists simultaneously observed her first verb phrase constructions.

Throughout January and February 1972, Genie more consistently used subject–verb and verb–object utterances, which linguists viewed as confirmation that she had mastered English word order. During this time she began to use the prepositions in and on, the first words she used to exclusively serve a grammatical purpose, although she did not always include them and all of her early uses were in answers to questions. When Curtiss tested her on possessive sentences such as "Point to the cat's foot" and "Point to the foot of the cat", Genie was only correct 50% of the time, but after March of that year she demonstrated full comprehension of both constructions despite not using either in her speech. In February 1972, she produced negative sentences, all consisting of "No more" appended to the beginning of either a noun or a noun and a verb which could have been an independent utterance.

In the spring of 1972, Genie began to spontaneously use the definite article the, marking the first determiner in her speech, but for several months almost exclusively used it in imitation. In April and May 1972, by which time she was steadily increasing the complexity of her verb phrases, she began using these with similarly expanded noun phrases. In May she also began using the verb have in possessive sentences, i.e., "Miss Fromkin have blue car." The following month she began to use "No more" with only a verb, such as "No more have", to form negative sentences, always at the beginning of what could have been an independent utterance.

During July 1972, the scientists noted Genie's first verb-verb phrase sentences, such as "Like chew meat", and she then quickly began using complex verbs with complex noun phrases, as in the utterance "Want buy toy refrigerator". By this time, Genie still showed no comprehension of regular plurals, so in her first active attempt to teach Genie grammar Curtiss created a test to help her learn them. By August 1972, Genie mastered them, in contrast with earlier observations of people acquiring language in their right hemispheres who never learned any singular/plural distinction. After that time, she used them in imitation, although she only used regular plurals in five undated spontaneous utterances despite practice with pronouncing a final s, and never used any irregular plurals.

By November 1972, Genie could use the word on, although it was uncertain whether she distinguished between on and in and Curtiss wrote that all of Genie's earliest utterances containing on and in were answers to somebody asking her a question, and could correctly use the suffix -ing to describe events in the present progressive. These were the first grammatical markers in her speech, and both are normally two of the first grammatical markers young children can use. Her use of -ing on exclusively dynamic verbs also indicated to linguists that she categorized dynamic versus stative verbs, although she did not use it with the verb to be until the fall of 1973, and then only when speaking in first or third-person. Even after learning the present progressive, she inconsistently gave correct responses to it on tests, and use of the suffix -ing was the only way Genie modified a sentence without changing any of the base words. Although Genie had gained some understanding of number words during her initial stay at Children's Hospital, she only began to count in sequential order in late 1972, always in very deliberate and laborious manner, and her progress was extremely slow.

In December 1972, after Curtiss and Genie had accidentally been locked out of the Riglers' home, Curtiss said to Genie, "Tell them [David and Marilyn Rigler] what happened" and Genie pointed to the door and said, "Tell door lock"; this indicated her language included recursion, which they considered an especially important development. The scientists interpreted another utterance from 1973, "Ask David see swing", as both further confirmation she had grasped recursion and the first complex sentence she produced. By this time, she understood and used intensifiers such as the word very, but only tenuously grasped superlatives. She never used them in her own speech but appeared to understand them, and while she was generally better with the suffix -est than the word most Curtiss thought Genie might not have known the actual meaning of -est. The contrast between her understanding and lack of production of superlatives further bolstered the researchers' belief that, even in the absence of language, her cognition had developed in some form.

In early 1973, Genie started using definite articles in imitative utterances, such as "In the backyard". By this time she had also gained the ability to spontaneously use the prepositions next to, beside, behind, in, at, front, and after. However, until 1975, she exclusively used at in the phrase at school, leading Curtiss to believe at school was one word in her vocabulary, and Genie inconsistently understood other prepositions such as behind, over, and in front of. Curtiss wrote that on tests Genie frequently mistook both behind and in back of for in front of, though by 1977, her understanding of behind on tests had substantially improved. By contrast, on non-test settings Genie's responses to in front of, behind, in back of, and under generally indicated comprehension; unlike most children, who learn under well before the other three, she had somewhat more difficulty with under.

In March 1973, Genie seemed unable to grasp on or under on one test, even though she had correctly used on in non-test settings, but the scientists suggested this was because of logistical difficulties unique to that test. On a different test, Genie at first gave correct responses to on 48% of the time, and her confusion was mostly with the words in or under, but by September 1973, she showed full comprehension of both in and on. (Note: In late 1973 she temporarily used the word in for both in and on, but Curtiss believed she simply merged the sounds and did not actually confuse the words.) Soon afterward, she began consistently including a in noun phrases, and eventually used both articles and the words and and more in noun phrases. In the early spring of that year she began to use the determiner another and started occasionally including prepositions and determiners in adverbial phrases, such as, "In hospital, shot hurt arm". Genie's acquisition of locative adverbs came before she learned ones for either time or manner, which was normal, but although she started to use time adverbs a few months later she never used any manner adverbs.

By April 1973, Genie began regularly using verb particles in her spontaneous utterances, frequently using phrases such as "put back" and "take off", and began using imperative sentences using the vocative case. (Note: Prior to using imperative sentences, to tell someone what to do Genie would grab a person's face and orient it towards her own, and the person had to determine what Genie wanted based on gestures or other context.) Researchers noted she began using imperatives much later in the language acquisition process than normal and that they remained very infrequent, and considered either her emotional difficulties or lack of self-concept possible explanations. By mid-1973, Genie had begun to include indirect objects in her sentences, such as "Curtiss give me valentine", and could use definite and indefinite articles but never distinguished between the two. In addition, whereas most people learn to use demonstratives and numbers at the same time, she never used these in her early spontaneous noun phrases, and in 1977, Curtiss noted that Genie had never used any demonstratives. In the fall of 1973, Genie began correctly using the verb has as the third person singular form of the verb to have, but continued not to conjugate it in most situations and never used any other third person singular forms, so linguists suggested she may have learned it as a separate word instead of a conjugation.

In October 1973, in addition to forming negative sentences with the phrase "no more", Genie began to use the word "no" by itself. For both, she still appended the negation to the beginning of an otherwise unaltered utterance, which was the normal first step for children learning negation. About a week later, she started using the word not in the same manner in sentences and showed clear understanding of more complex forms of negation. But while children usually quickly progress to saying "I not" and then "I do not", and then learn to use contractions, Genie did not move past this stage until early 1975. In addition, despite clearly understanding the negative prefix un- by this time Genie never used it in her speech.

===== Early pronoun comprehension =====
Starting in September 1972, Curtiss spent a great deal of time testing Genie's acquisition of pronouns and at first found that Genie strenuously resisted, often refusing to respond or clearly guessing, until becoming more receptive to them in late 1973. By December 1972, Genie understood and spontaneously used the pronoun I, pronouncing it with more stress for emphasis, but almost exclusively used it with the words want or like and still frequently referred to herself by name. She did not show any comprehension of any other pronouns besides you and me, which she interchangeably used; Genie would often say, "Mama love you" while pointing to herself, which Curtiss attributed to a manifestation of Genie's inability to distinguish who she was from who someone else was. Genie did not spontaneously use any other pronouns or use pronominal forms in her speech, although by 1973, she clearly understood the reciprocal pronoun each other.

In 1973 and early 1974, Genie identified possessive pronouns, such as his, your, and my, with less than 50% accuracy. By 1973 she began to use the word my, making my and the possessive pronoun her the only possessive pronouns she learned. Curtiss wrote that this comprehension was not total, and was at least partially predicated on the method of testing. (Note: When not looking at the pictures Curtiss used for this test Genie often misinterpreted the word her as either my or your, but when looking at the pictures she only mistook it for the word his.) On another test from this time on reflexive pronouns, such as "The boy is feeding himself", she got more wrong than right but did somewhat better on sentences using object pronouns, such as "He is feeding him". Curtiss also recorded Genie using the word it twice, but only in sentences that were, for all practical purposes, imitative utterances.

===== Interrogative questions =====
Prior to January 1972, if someone asked Genie a question using the interrogative word where she invariably responded by saying the last word of the speaker's sentence. In early January 1972 she began to give accurate, grammatical responses to where questions in conversations. By February 1972, in everyday interactions Genie clearly understood and appropriately acted on most questions using the interrogative words who, what, where, when, why, which, and how. Unlike most children, who grasp who, what, which, and where questions much earlier than when, how, or why questions, the only one of these which took longer for Genie understand was why, and even this took much less time than linguists expected. Because the latter group of questions require more cognitive sophistication to properly answer, the scientists offered this as additional proof that Genie had a higher level of cognitive functioning than most children in similar phases of language acquisition.

Despite this, on most simple test questions such as "Who is the girl pulling?" or "What is the red box on?" Genie did not react or reply to test questions at all. When she did respond she clearly had no understanding of the sentence and gave completely ungrammatical and nonsensical answers, either stating the answer in the question, attempting to fuse two separate questions into one, or attempting to state a declarative sentence as a question. She also remained entirely unable to ask an interrogative question in conversation, only ever attempting to upon specific request, and efforts during mid-1973 to help her memorize interrogative questions were completely unsuccessful. (Note: The scientists wrote that to make requests she would usually either point to something, use facial expressions, or repeat what appeared to be a declarative sentence until someone recognized it was intended as a question.) Curtiss theorized this inability was because Genie had no deixis or linguistic movement in her speech, and in 1975 the scientists speculated emotional difficulties may have made her unwilling to attempt them in spontaneous speech. Curtiss attributed Genie's failure to memorize them to being generally unable to remember sentences using grammar she had not mastered, which is typical of young children. After seeing how much trouble the tests gave Genie Curtiss ended them, and after approximately a year people stopped asking her to produce these questions.

==== 1974–mid-1975: Later testing ====
Selected utterances
Utterance	Date	Notes	Curtiss' gloss (if any)
Another dog have house.	Early 1974	Spontaneous use of a determiner	The other dog has a house.
Talk Mama to buy mixmaster.	May 4, 1974	Complex complement structure	I'll tell Mama to buy me a mixmaster.
I am thinking about Miss J. at school in hospital.	May 6, 1974	Two prepositional phrases in one sentence	N/A
Want Curtiss play piano.	August 7, 1974	Sentence indicating desire	N/A
I want think about Mama riding bus.	November 20, 1974	Increased complexity of complement structure	N/A
Teacher said Genie have temper tantrum outside.	May 2, 1975	Serial verb construction	N/A
I do not have a toy green basket.	July 25, 1975	Do-support	N/A

From October 1973 to January 1974, on simple past tense sentences such as, "The girl opened the umbrella" Genie was only correct 50% of the time, but was almost perfect with past tense completive sentences marked with the verb finish, such as "The girl finished opening the umbrella." (Note: Curtiss deliberately added the latter element after Genie had begun learning sign language, as linguists already knew that children learning American Sign Language learned to comprehend and use the completive past tense aspect much more quickly than children learning spoken English.) It was unclear if she learned to use irregular past tense verbs, as all of her utterances in which she used them were either imitations or responses to questions containing them. Curtiss also used this test to gauge Genie's knowledge of the future tense, and found she showed almost perfect comprehension of the going-to future construction but showed no understanding of sentences with an identical semantic meaning but using the auxiliary verb will; by contrast, children almost always correctly respond to both. The scientists wrote her lack of comprehension or use of auxiliary structures, despite understanding identical messages phrased with inflected words, was consistent with her ability to grasp conceptual information far better than grammar.

At the end of 1973 and into early 1974 Genie's locative sentences underwent considerable expansion, as she produced utterances such as, "Like good Harry at hospital". In a few sentences from this time she began to incorporate the words of other people into her own utterances, as in "Dentist say drink water"; direct quotations would remain the only situation in which she could engage in any embedding of elements of language, and these remained very rare. (Note: There was some question among the scientists over one utterance, "Marilyn said not lift my leg in the dentist chair"; since Genie sometimes confused my and your, linguists were unsure if she was trying to explain what Marilyn said to her or if she had only reversed the pronouns while quoting Marilyn.) On one occasion in early February 1974 she used the iterative aspect via reduplication in the utterance "Tomorrow big, big prize hula hoop". As this kind of reduplication is much more commonly expressed through the word very, Curtiss found Genie's use of it abnormal.

By early 1974 the scientists estimated that Genie's grammar was congruous with a typical two or two and a half-year old, although her progress remained unusually slow. Around this time Curtiss found that, unlike most children but similar to adult split-brain and left hemispherectomy patients, she was completely unable to distinguish between active and passive voice, giving random responses to these sentences and never gaining any use of the passive voice. In these sentences Genie would often, though not always, confuse the subject and object, contrasting with her ability to process subject–verb–object sentences in other contexts and her own subject–verb–object sentences, but these reversals were only with certain pronouns and became significantly less common by January 1974. On a test between February 1974 to July 1975, Genie also showed no comprehension of the words many, most, few, or fewest.

In the late spring of 1974 Genie began to use the phrase no more to represent its common lexical meaning, as demonstrated in the utterance "No more penny". During May 1974 Curtiss recorded Genie's first compound noun phrases, which were the only times Genie would use the word and. At the same time Curtiss noted Genie's first compound sentences, but with one possible exception, the utterance "I want save money buy two rectangle box" dated early October 1974, she did not use any compound verb phrases. (Note: Because Genie had not included the word and, Curtiss wrote it was unclear whether the sentence truly contained a compound verb phrase or if it was a for–to complement sentence.) During this time Genie also used a few verb infinitives in her speech, in all instances clearly treating them as one word, and began adding the pronoun my to her possessive sentences and using the marker 's to indicate possession. Curtiss also noted that Genie never confused gender, although she only marked it through gender-specific nouns.

In both test settings and conversations Genie still sometimes reversed I and you, my and your, and me and you, but during the summer of 1974 she began to show definite improvement in both her comprehension and production of first and second person pronouns. In August she started to demonstrate the ability to modify first subject and then object pronouns. By mid-1975, her confusion of me versus you and my versus your was much less frequent. Curtiss also noted Genie starting to use the benefactive case during this time, although she did not always include the word for.

Genie also understood -self and -selves as reflexive pronoun markers, and in most scenarios she understood reflexive pronouns. The exception was when she encountered a noun phrase with a pronoun she misunderstood; for instance, if given the sentence, "He is feeding himself", she frequently confused he with she and therefore changed himself to herself. (Note: Curtiss noted that in sentences with noun phrases entirely consisting of nouns Genie only reversed the pronouns once, and on that occasion quickly corrected herself, meaning that for the pronoun tests she used a word order strategy.) In sentences with reciprocals or the reflexive pronoun themselves she appeared to understand the pronoun they, but never used it in her own speech; Curtiss thought Genie was likely guessing the meaning from context, as Genie could discern plurality from the elements of the sentences using it. Her pronoun acquisition was described at that time as "painfully slow", but researchers insisted there was definite progress. There were certain pronouns, such as object pronouns or the word there as a pronoun, that Genie never used or understood.

In the fall of 1974 Genie produced a few utterances with internal negatives, although she had specifically practiced all but two of these early sentences and one of the spontaneous occurrences was a partial imitation, and these sentences grew more common until she completely mastered their use by early 1975. Curtiss did not view this as linguistic movement, believing that Genie's grammar simply changed to place negations in the middle of a sentence. By the fall of 1974 Genie began differentiating between third-person pronouns such as he and she, but still had a high rate of error and did not use these, relative pronouns, and indefinite pronouns. She had used locatives after subject noun phrases for a long time, but only did so after an object phrase in late 1974. At around the same time she had begun to use more than one prepositional phrase in some sentences, and in the spring of 1975 she fully comprehended the preposition between on tests.

In 1975 Genie began to use a different type of serial verb construction, in sentences such as "I like go ride Miss F. car". Curtiss noted that all of these were first-person utterances, that she almost never said the word I, and that she frequently used standalone verbs, such as go, which typically precede a second verb; although in several cases she said go ride and go walk, Curtiss thought Genie may have treated these as single words and were therefore not as complicated as they appeared. In addition, all of these sentences were in verb–(verb–verb phrase) form which Curtiss concluded had no hierarchical structure, although an outside analysis argued they had contained some degree of hierarchy. In non-test settings during early 1975 Genie gave some indications, including one verbal response to David Rigler, that she grasped conditional sentences, but Curtiss said she could not be completely certain. Curtiss also noted that, despite the fact that Genie clearly understood contractions, she did not use any in her speech.

By at least 1975 Genie clearly understood and incorporated the concept of temporality into her speech, and unusually for people acquiring a first language she understood the words before and after before learning past or future tense markers. She could also use sentences to indicate causation, albeit without saying the words if and then. Despite this, by 1975 Genie remained largely unable to respond to sentences where the nouns were not in the same sequence as the events, such as "Touch your ear after you touch your nose", although she improved more with sentences asking her to do something after instead of doing something before. In a 1981 paper Curtiss interpreted Genie's temporal utterances as an expansion of Genie's vocabulary, but an outside analysis of Curtiss' writings concluded that Genie had to have acquired some degree of grammar to have formed these sentences.

When first asked to distinguish between all, some, and one Genie would interpret some to mean all, but by 1975 she reversed this and began mistaking some for one, which Curtiss interpreted as a sign of progress. (Note: Curtiss noted two complicating factors on this test. She thought one of the pictures she used may have been confusing for Genie, and that unlike most of Curtiss' other tests Genie had a 50% chance of getting a correct answer just from guessing.) This contrasted with her distinction between more and less, which she had demonstrated by at least August 1973, and her understanding of the qualifiers one and all in everyday conversations. When learning relative terms such as large and small or narrow and wide she simultaneously learned both words in the pair, whereas most people acquire either the marked or the negative form first, and never mistakenly used one term in a pair to mean the other. Although she had difficulty with different pairs of relative and relational terms on tests, she showed significantly greater comprehension outside of test settings.

In early 1975 Genie began to use a type of ungrammatical sentence with a subject–verb–(object or subject)–verb–({subject or object}–verb) construction. Curtiss wrote that some of these sentences could have been grammatically correct if they included relative pronouns, but that others looked like two separate sentences which Genie had simply combined while removing some of the nouns. At around the same time Genie also began to produce ungrammatical sentences containing a copula, first with utterances such as "Is Akron" and later including verbs without the -ing suffix such as "Boy is pinch". Curtiss wrote that approximately one half of these types of ungrammatical sentences were Genie's responses to people who told her to, "speak in sentences", which she would interpret as being asked to include a form of to be in a sentence. Curtiss noted that Genie also produced some grammatical sentences with copulas, such as "Glass is clear".

Despite mastering word order, Genie still had difficulty with distinguishing between simple actor–action–object sentences. In 1975, when given the sentences "The girl pulls the boy" or "The boy pulls the girl" and asked to point to the corresponding picture, her answers would either be all correct or all incorrect. While this was progress from 1971 and 1972, when she simply guessed, this indicated that she was attempting to use a word order strategy but could not ascertain a specific formula. Her difficulty with this also manifested itself in her inability to use word order to tell the difference between sentences such as, "What is on the blue box?" and, "What is the blue box on?". In addition to the disparity with the results on pronoun and relative clause tests, in which she used word order strategies, researchers wrote this was a major contrast with the clear word order rules in her spontaneous speech.

By early 1975 Genie showed comprehension of simple and complex sentences where the object was the relative clause, such as "The boy is looking at the girl who is frowning", or sentences where the subject was the relative clause and did not end in a noun phrase, such as "The boy who is frowning is looking at the girl". However, when interpreting a complex sentence in which a relative clause ending in a noun phrase came before the main verb, such as "The boy who is looking at the girl is frowning", she interpreted the noun closest to the verb as the subject. The scientists wrote that this meant that she was using a word order strategy, which they considered progress because her earlier responses to them were clearly guesses. (Note: Scientists wrote this supported a hypothesis, first proposed in 1970, that children steadily improve comprehension of these sentences for approximately four years before temporarily perceiving the first noun as the subject and the second as the object in all cases.) By this time Genie could only consistently count as high as 7 in sequential order, which came at the expense of her ability to do so via gestalt perception.

By 1975 Genie demonstrated full comprehension of several paired words, such as long and short or high and low. Most of the time she learned both words in a pair at the same time, and in a few cases learned either the negative or the marked word in the pair first; for instance, she learned the word narrow before wide and few before many. For some paired words, such as left and right, her answers on tests were still less than 100% even by 1977 consistently showed the same level of understanding for each word. However, Genie never made any distinction between the words here and there; on multiple tests, when told to come or go to a person or area her response to either, "Come here" and, "Go there" was always to go to either the closest or the farthest person or area.

When Genie left the Riglers' house in mid-1975, at the age of 18, she had acquired a degree of vocabulary and grammar far greater than that observed in non-human subjects. In June of that year, David Rigler wrote that she continued to make significant strides in every field which the scientists were testing. Despite the marked improvement in Genie's language, it was still clearly abnormal. The words she learned continued to remain far ahead of the grammar she possessed and still showed an unusual focus on objective properties, and the gap between her receptive and expressive vocabulary had grown. While her use and comprehension of grammar had clearly improved, and papers from the time indicated she was continuing to acquire it, they were still highly deficient and her progress remained far slower than linguists had anticipated. And how much of what she did use was attributable to acquisition versus rote memory was not readily obvious.

===== Auxiliary structure =====
Despite Genie's grammar acquisition, her speech remained entirely devoid of pro-forms, modal verbs, or auxiliary verbs. She memorized a few ritual phrases containing auxiliary structures but only used them in very specific ways, so linguists did not consider these grammar acquisition. In the spring of 1974 Curtiss thought Genie may have acquired use of the contractible auxiliary you, but wrote that she only used it in sentences that were mostly imitative. In January 1974 the scientists noted the first copulas in her spontaneous sentences, but she never used a contractible copula. By early 1975 Genie had started including do-support in some of her sentences, such as the utterance "I do not have a red pail", but only in negative sentences with memorized phrases, almost exclusively the phrase I do not have, causing Curtiss to speculate that Genie had simply memorized the words "I do" as an independent phrase. Even then, Genie frequently omitted or incorrectly used it.

=== Conversational abilities ===
During everyday interactions with other people Genie inconsistently applied what linguistic abilities she possessed, although her use of both vocabulary and grammar remained better in imitation than in her own spontaneous speech. Her ability and willingness to engage in verbal interactions steadily increased during her stay with the Riglers, and she used her language to serve a progressively larger number of functions. Nonetheless, she continued to speak very little, and when she did talk it was almost always in utterances significantly shorter than she was actually able to spontaneously produce. Because of this, the scientists wrote that it was extremely difficult to analyze her comprehension and use of grammar in conversations.

Unusually for a first language learner, Genie never engaged in any kind of experimentation with language. Sometimes if Genie mastered an aspect of grammar she would not use it in everyday interactions, such as imperatives, and with many others, such as past tense or plural words, she only used the correct words or markers if separately and specifically requested she do so. If someone asked Genie a yes or no question she often repeated part of the question or said "no" even if she clearly meant yes and shook her head the correct way, which Curtiss concluded was Genie simply repeating the last word of the sentence. By contrast, she frequently understood and responded to highly complex questions that she could not on tests, especially sentences requiring some degree of inference and sentences performing both a locutionary and illocutionary act. Her comprehension of other complex sentences remained inconsistent, although beginning in November 1973 researchers recorded slow but noticeable improvement.

The scientists also measured Genie's conversational competence. Most verbal interactions with her consisted either of someone asking her a question several times until she responded or her saying something to which the other person responded, and unless she actively attempted to control a conversation's direction she relied on the other person to achieve and maintain its flow. She typically did not acknowledge statements, requests, or other common pieces of conversation, and when she did respond it was often with a significant delay. Curtiss wrote that Genie grew progressively better at both, although even by mid-1975 she did not always respond or took an unusually long time to do so. If she did respond she often repeated something said earlier, and she used repetitive statements to serve several conversational functions.

In everyday interactions Genie became steadily more willing and able to speak during her stay with the Riglers, often spontaneously contributing to an ongoing discussion and sometimes doing so even if the conversation did not initially involve her and was not specifically about her. She was generally more willing to start or enter conversations on topics which interested her, although she would sometimes attempt to join in a conversation on other matters. When she wanted to talk about a particular subject she would sometimes allow the topic to change, but often persisted by repeating herself even after someone made multiple efforts to discuss something else. Otherwise she normally went along with a topic somebody else raised, and when attempting to enter an ongoing conversation she would try to say something relevant. If she could not say something semantically related to a topic, she sometimes tried to join in using other means; Curtiss recalled one dinner conversation at the Riglers' home in 1972 in which several people used the word "tenant", and in an effort to contribute Genie said the word "ten" and held up ten fingers.

As Genie learned more language she gradually included more grammatical complexity in her speech during everyday interactions, and began to apply her language to more everyday situations. In late 1973 she startled linguists when she gave a monologue consisting of a series of short utterances to a small group of familiar adults, which was much longer than any of her previously recorded speech; while she only used grammar she had fully mastered she seemed to be using different words to try to express herself, which Curtiss thought was a sort of free association, making it the closest she came to attempting any language experimentation. Genie subsequently spoke at this length on a few more occasions, always in the same manner and on similar topics. She also began to use language to describe fictional events, describing some of fantasies in language as early as January 1973 and attempting on at least two occasions in 1974 and 1975 to lie.

To supplement Genie's language acquisition, once Genie started to combine words the scientists worked to teach Genie ritual speech for common everyday situations. Soon after beginning to produce two-word utterances Genie learned the phrases "Give me [example]", "Help me [example]", and "I want [example]", and later learned "May I have [example]?". (Note: Curtiss noted that just using this phrase in and of itself did not guarantee Genie would receive what she asked for.) Analyses of Genie's utterances beginning with "I want" concluded that Genie treated the phrase as one word, and noted that the dependent clauses in these utterances could all have been separate utterances and never had markers indicating dependence. Linguists also noted that the phrase "Help me" always preceded a verb, whereas "Give me", "May I have", and "I want" always preceded nouns. In addition, since she could only use the word may as a part of the phrase "May I have" to ask a question and never produced a statement or asked about someone else with it, Curtiss did not consider these utterances true use of an auxiliary structure.

By contrast, Genie never used any automatic speech or interjections during conversations. Despite repeated efforts to teach her she could not start an interaction with automatic speech, and she only responded to ritual questions, such as "How are you?", if someone repeatedly asked her and pushed her into doing so; she then could say "How are you?" or "I am fine", but it would be very forced. The only exception was when the person speaking to her had some additional affect, after which she usually laughed or tried to get the person to do it again. (Note: To greet someone, once she began using the word like she usually said "like [X]" or, after learning to use the pronoun I, "I like [X]".) In addition, Genie never learned any profanity nor ever used other substitute swear words. These aspects of speech are typically either bilateral or originate in the right hemisphere, and split-brain and hemispherectomy patients normally learn them without difficulty, but linguists were unsurprised that Genie never used them. Curtiss wrote that Genie's failure to do so was because her childhood gave her no opportunity to observe conversation, where children typically learn them.

Despite Genie's increased willingness and ability to engage in conversation she continued to speak far less than most people in equivalent phases of language acquisition, and her conversational competence remained very low. In her dissertation, Curtiss wrote that in many aspects Genie's overall demeanor continued to bear a strong resemblance to that of a person who had not been socialized. The scientists found Genie's inability to master conversational skills was unsurprising and suggested that the ability to engage in conversation was a separate skill from simply knowing language, consistent with earlier observations of retarded and autistic children. They therefore attributed Genie's difficulty with conversation to her lack of socialization during childhood instead of her language constraints.

==== Recalling past events ====
During a Children's Hospital visit near Christmas 1971 a boy playing with a toy pistol frightened Genie, and when Curtiss tried to reassure her Genie said an abbreviated version of Curtiss' words, "Little bad boy. Bad gun." About two weeks later Curtiss heard Genie speaking to herself and using an invented gesture for the word "naughty", and when Curtiss asked Genie what she said she repeated, "Little bad boy. Bad gun." out loud for several minutes, marking the first time she spoke about something in the past. Several months later David and Marilyn overheard her saying, "Father hit big stick. Father is angry." to herself, marking the first time anyone heard her talk about her life before starting to acquire language. She infrequently spoke to others about her early life, but the Riglers said that for the rest of the time she lived with them she constantly repeated, "Father hit" to herself. By the end of her stay, she could also talk about something someone else had told her.

=== Speech ===
Some of Genie's pronunciation rules and limitations were characteristic of typical General American English speakers, and her progress with learning to pronounce individual phonemes followed relatively normal patterns for a first-language learner, but many others were highly atypical. Her speech typically contained unusually extensive deletions and substitutions, including vowel reduction, neutralization, and consonant modifications, and she typically spoke in an extremely high-pitched and monotonic voice. Curtiss determined that, despite the unpredictability with which Genie applied many of her pronunciation rules, there were several clearly defined patterns in her speech. Some of Genie's pronunciation rules and phonological limitations were normal for General American English speakers, and she clearly limited the variability of her substitutions. Similar to young children, Genie's enunciation remained far better in imitation than in her own utterances. The scientists worked very hard to strengthen Genie's voice and improve her articulation, but in her dissertation Curtiss wrote that Genie's speech was still extremely difficult to represent using the standard International Phonetic Alphabet.

From the outset scientists could tell that Genie's vowel substitutions were clearly not random, but she did not seem to draw distinctions based on normal classification such as front versus back vowels or open versus close vowels. In her dissertation, Curtiss wrote that Genie still laxed and centralized the pronunciation of vowels and off-glides. When she began using longer words and sentences she often deleted unstressed syllables, for instance pronouncing the word refrigerator as [frɪ]. As with vowels she would often delete or substitute consonants, although with considerably less variability than with vowels, and for several she had different pronunciation rules based on the position of the phoneme in the word.

There were three consonants, the voiced dental fricative, voiced palato-alveolar affricate, and voiceless palato-alveolar affricate, which Genie did not spontaneously pronounce until 1973 and only inconsistently pronounced after that time. Until 1973, instead of pronouncing alveolar lateral approximants and retroflex approximants as separate sounds she articulated both in a manner that Curtiss described as a sound somewhere in between. Genie would also typically, although not always, simplify or delete consonant clusters. The one regular exception was that a rhotic approximant almost always remained intact because Genie seemed to interpret it as a part of the preceding vowel.

In addition, there were several sounds that Genie did not use as initial or final consonants. Before 1973 Genie frequently, but not always, deleted final consonants without any discernible pattern. Researchers suspected this was the reason Genie did not usually use plural forms, possessive markers, and past tense or third person singular conjugations. If someone imitated her deletion of a final consonant she would laugh, reply, "Silly", gesture, and then repeat her utterance with both the final consonant and any other sounds she had initially deleted, causing Curtiss to speculate that Genie simply was not paying attention to how her speech sounded.

In November 1971, Genie displayed an ability to change pitch and volume while singing that she had never demonstrated in her speech. Around a week after the first time she sang, while on a trip to the hospital, Curtiss improvised a song to calm Genie down and Genie again surprised her by singing along; Curtiss especially noticed that Genie sang the word "hospital" far louder than she had ever spoken. Almost a year after moving in with the Riglers, while David Rigler was examining and cleaning her ear, Genie uttered the only recorded scream of her lifetime. The scientists did not know why she had screamed on that particular occasion, or why they never heard her do so again.

Curtiss and Fromkin wrote that by 1973 Genie seemed to be slowly improving her articulation and that she had clearly strengthened and gained more control over her voice, and by at least the middle of that year she could distinguish and articulate all the sounds of General American. During that year she started to use pitch variation in addition to vowel duration to indicate stress, with the latter remaining the primary method for doing so but becoming much less obtrusive and exaggerated, but she still did not vary pitch or volume to indicate either questions or imperative sentences. While her voice remained largely monotonic she began including more speech patterns and intonation, sometimes in spontaneous speech but more consistently in imitation. Despite this she still did not use either voiced or voiceless dental fricatives in spontaneous speech, though she had imitated them since June 1972, and inconsistently used affricates in spontaneous speech.

In 1973, Genie began optionally articulating consonant clusters consisting of an /s/ followed by a nasal consonant. For words starting with an /s/ followed by other types of consonant clusters Genie started to break up the cluster with an epenthetic schwa and soon after, in longer words where she would have previously deleted a vowel, she began to include a schwa where the deleted sound would have been; because reduced vowels in English are generally schwas, linguists thought she could have been gaining command of English phonology. Around the same time, linguists noted that she began to pronounce more final consonants. By 1975 Genie started to pronounce both voiced and voiceless dental fricatives, albeit rarely, in various word positions, and when she did she frequently stopped them.

In 1975 the scientists said that Genie's voice had clearly strengthened and she modified both pitch and volume for emphasis and stress, but she continued to avoid speaking if possible because controlling her voice remained very difficult for her. Her vocalizations were still soft and breathy, and they wrote that, "it is still very difficult to understand her if you have not been with her for a period of time." In mid-1975 she could speak with a relatively normal declarative sentence stress pattern, and began to do so with increasing frequency. Even then her pronunciation also remained abnormal, as she still frequently deleted and substituted sounds in her speech, and she remained unable to use intonation to indicate a question.

==== Haplologies ====
When Genie started forming longer sentences, she often produced extreme haplologies. She frequently omitted morphological elements which, though necessary to make the utterance grammatical, were clear to present observers, causing speculation that Genie had a grammar rule first mandating and then optionally permitting her to remove grammatical elements which were non-essential in context. At other times Genie condensed and deleted sounds, syllables, or entire words in ways which rendered her speech ambiguous, and for no discernible reason sometimes said the same sentence with and without any omissions. This significantly complicated attempts to determine Genie's true linguistic abilities, and researchers speculated this may have led to her comprehension scores being significantly lower on certain language analysis tests. In May 1972, by which time Genie regularly spoke in three or four-word utterances, she attempted to truncate several of her sentences to monosyllables, such as pronouncing the sentence "Monday Curtiss come" as [mʌ̃k]. Marilyn and Curtiss told Genie they could not talk to her if she spoke in such a manner, after which she stopped attempting such extreme haplologies, but she still continued to condense sounds when possible.

=== Nonverbal communication ===
Genie gradually began to outwardly exhibit more of her emotions, and for reasons the scientists never managed to discern she maintained her unexplained ability to communicate her desires to complete strangers without words. Even while speaking she continued to use supplementary nonverbal gestures to improve her intelligibility. Prior to mid-1974 she invented gestures to indicate specific phonemes and homonyms regardless of semantic context, unlike previous observations of invented signing systems in which individual gestures exclusively communicated semantic meaning. Sometimes she used one gesture for two similar-sounding but not completely homophonic words, such as her use of the same gesture for both the words "disappear" and "disappointed".

In addition to signing Genie would pantomime some words as she spoke, for instance crouching into a seated position when saying the words "sit" or "sick", and act out sequences of events. Unlike young children, for who this is typically ancillary to their speech and lessens as they acquire more language, Genie maintained this as an integral part of her vocabulary. At first Genie only drew pictures if specifically asked, but later began to draw pictures or use images from magazines or books to relate to daily experiences or if she could not express herself in words. Until 1973 Curtiss and Fromkin unsuccessfully tried to teach Genie to read and write, although other people made subsequent attempts; by the time Curtiss presented her dissertation Genie had learned to read approximately five to ten unspecified names and words, and could write individual letters in print.

To take advantage of Genie's nonverbal abilities, in 1974 the Riglers arranged for her to receive sign language instruction; Curtiss described the type of sign language as being, "a system of signing somewhere between American Sign Language and signed English in its grammatical system." Curtiss wrote that Genie would often simultaneously speak and sign, and continued to use and invent her own gestures, but while she continued to use her existing gestures for individual phonemes she started creating new ones to convey a semantic meaning. The scientists did not specifically test Genie's sign language, but Curtiss recorded that by February 1975 Genie could use the sign to indicate a plural and that by the spring of 1975 used the past tense sign. In addition, when told to start a sentence in sign language with the word he Genie produced "The boy signing is he cookie".

== Post-1975 ==
In June 1975, the National Institute of Mental Health cut off their funding for the case study on Genie. Shortly afterwards, in the early summer of 1975, Genie moved out of the Riglers' home to live with her mother. Despite the NIMH grant ending Curtiss continued to regularly meet with her, both administering weekly tests and spending time with her outside of test sessions, and the Riglers maintained contact with Genie and her mother. While living with her mother, Genie continued to be largely unresponsive to statements or requests. After a few months, Genie's mother transferred Genie into the first of what would become a succession of foster homes.

Selected utterances
Utterance	Date	Curtiss' gloss (if any)
I want live back Marilyn house.	November 1975	I want to go back to Marilyn's house to live.
Genie Mama have a father long time ago.	December 1975	N/A
Spool wind thread.	December 1976	N/A
Think about Mama love Genie.	August 1977	I am thinking about my wish that that fact [sic] that Mama loves Genie.
Do not through. I want through.	October 1977	That box is opaque. I want the kind you can see through.
Hot dog eat, eat the hot dog, eat hot dog.	November 1977	N/A

Soon after Genie moved into this foster home the people running it began subjecting her to extreme physical and emotional abuse, causing her language skills to rapidly regress and making her return to her coping mechanism of silence. The incident with the largest impact occurred when they severely beat the already-abused Genie for vomiting and told her that if she did it again she would never see her mother, which rapidly accelerated her regression and made her extremely scared of opening her mouth for anything, including speaking, out of fear of vomiting and being beaten again. As she still wanted to communicate with people she knew, she began almost exclusively using the sign language she learned while living with the Riglers. During this time Curtiss was the only person who had worked with Genie to have any regular contact with her, meeting once a week to continue testing, and she wrote that Genie's language skills severely deteriorated due to the abuse she endured. Curtiss recalled that during this time Genie frenetically signed to her on a variety of topics, but said she could not bring herself to open her mouth so she could speak. Years later, Curtiss said that at one point Genie refused to talk for five months.

Upon Genie's removal from this location in April 1977 she required a two-week stay at Children's Hospital, where she was able to see her mother and the Riglers. While she was there her condition somewhat improved, but she continued mostly using sign language to communicate. That month, Curtiss and Fromkin obtained a year-long grant from the National Science Foundation to continue working with Genie. Authorities then moved her to another foster home for several months, an arrangement in which Genie reportedly did fairly well but which unexpectedly ended in late 1977, and after giving her temporary accommodations through the end of December of that year authorities moved her into a different location. In early January 1978 Curtiss wrote a letter in which she stated these moves were all very hard on Genie, causing continued regression in all aspects of her life, and that their frequency heightened their traumatic impact.

In 1976 Curtiss finished and presented her dissertation, Genie: A Psycholinguistic Study of a Modern-Day "Wild Child", which analyzed Genie's language up to the early summer of 1975. It received reviews from several prominent scientists, and the following year Academic Press published it. Curtiss continued working with Genie through the end of 1977, but after meeting with her on January 3, 1978, Genie's mother suddenly prevented linguists from seeing Genie, immediately ending all testing and evaluations. Curtiss published Genie's utterances from mid-1975 to the end of 1977, and analysis of them, in papers she wrote and co-wrote in 1979. After this, Curtiss continued to analyze Genie's language in later papers.

=== Post-1977 ===
Between early 1978 and mid-1993 Genie moved through several more institutions and foster homes, some of which subjected her to severe abuse and harassment. Jay Shurley saw Genie at least twice during this time, once at her 27th birthday party in 1984 and again in 1986, and several years later recalled that during both visits she was almost completely silent and made very little outward expression or eye contact. In 1992 Curtiss said that since 1978 she had only heard two updates on Genie's condition, both indicating she almost never spoke, and in a 1993 book on Genie author Russ Rymer wrote that as of 1992 she very rarely spoke. In a 1994 afterword to his book, Rymer wrote that in early 1993 Genie's mother told him Genie was significantly more verbal, albeit hard to understand. The Riglers reestablished contact with Genie and her mother in mid-1993, and shortly afterwards David Rigler wrote that when he and Marilyn first visited Genie she immediately recognized and greeted both of them by name.

The latest available information on Genie's speech is from May 2008. That year ABC News reported that, in 2000, someone speaking to them under condition of anonymity had hired a private investigator who located Genie. According to the investigator, she only spoke a few words but could still communicate fairly well in sign language. In 2002 Curtiss said that she would be interested in measuring Genie's linguistic abilities again, but in July 2016 she said she had not seen Genie since January 1978.

== Impact ==
Genie's is one of the best-known cases of language acquisition in a child with delayed linguistic development. Curtiss argued that Genie's case supported Chomsky's hypothesis of innate language, but that Genie demonstrated the necessity of early language stimulation in the left hemisphere of the brain to start. Because Genie had learned vocabulary and clearly mastered some principles of grammar Curtiss contended that she definitively disproved more extreme conceptualizations of the critical period hypothesis, which predicted that no or almost no language acquisition of any kind could occur after the end of critical period. Instead, she argued that Genie provided evidence for a gradual variation of it; that although some degree of acquisition can occur beyond puberty, permitting some form of ability to communicate using language, it would never progress into normal-sounding speech.

Furthermore, Curtiss argued that Genie proved only linguistic stimulation could cause the lateralization of language functions, pointing out that Genie's language center had not developed in her left hemisphere despite experiencing enough environmental stimulation to commence lateralization of other brain functions. Without this stimulation, a person would be rendered incapable of processing language from the left hemisphere of the brain and would be forced to only use the right hemisphere. The contrast between Genie's vocabulary and grammar acquisition also supported the existing hypothesis that these two processes underwent separate development during language acquisition. Genie's inability to master language despite clear progress in her cognitive development in other areas also suggested that language acquisition and cognition were separate, a new concept at the time.

Genie's inability to engage in normal interactions with other people provided additional evidence that understanding the principles of language was a separate skill from the ability to engage in conversations. In addition, her rapid progress with nonverbal communication and her exceptional proficiency at it demonstrated that even nonverbal communication was fundamentally separate from language. Her arguments have become widely accepted in the field of linguistics and other linguists and cognitive psychologists, including Steven Pinker and James Hurford, have cited Genie's case study as evidence for Chomsky's hypothesis of innate language and for a steadily progressing version of the critical period for language acquisition. Curtiss' findings were also the impetus for several additional studies on both delayed and abnormal language acquisition.

Analysis of the aspects of grammar that Genie did and did not acquire aided linguists in determining which structures were more dependent on exposure to language. In particular, the auxiliary component of language had been known to be one of the few children acquire at different rates depending on the amount of speech they heard. Genie's inability to master it supported the idea that its development and that of other similar systems of grammar is more sensitive than vocabulary or more basic grammar, such as word order or recursion, requiring a more conducive language environment to properly develop and having a more specific critical period. Linguists also noted the grammatical skills Genie acquired and used bore striking resemblance to the grammar of pidgin languages and the gesture systems deaf children invent when isolated from other deaf people, which contain certain aspects of language, such as vocabulary, recursion, and word order, but always lack other components such as auxiliary structures.

Genie's language acquisition also refined existing hypotheses and gave rise to additional hypotheses about what parts of language the right hemisphere could acquire after the critical period. Throughout the course of her linguistic development her language had remained largely congruous with adult split-brain and left hemispherectomy patients. By contrast, in both previous and subsequent studies, people with the same conditions who began acquiring language in their right hemispheres prior to the end of the critical period had developed normal vocabulary and grammar. This further convinced the scientists that Genie's language acquisition was abnormal because she had started after the critical period, and therefore was processing language in the right hemisphere of her brain.

Genie's case has also been used in theorizing about whether the critical period hypothesis can be applied to the acquisition of a second language, a topic which remains the subject of considerable debate.

=== Earlier cases ===
Several people who have analyzed Genie's linguistic development have compared it to historical accounts of children with delayed language acquisition, including records of language deprivation experiments carried out under Psamtik I, King James IV of Scotland, and Holy Roman Emperor Frederick II. Linguists have especially noted the similarities between Genie's case study and the testing of Victor of Aveyron. The scientists acknowledged the impact these cases had on their research and testing methods, and linguists and historians have cited Genie's case as the impetus for reanalysis of the case study on Victor. Both the research team and outside analyses especially contrasted Genie and a case in the 1950s of a girl known by the name Isabella, who had been abused and isolated from all speech until the age of 6 but within a year of receiving therapy spoke using vocabulary and grammar typical of someone her age. Author Justin Leiber compared Genie to Helen Keller, particularly noting the differences between the language instruction each received.

=== Debate ===
==== Scientific value ====
Some of the scientists who worked with Genie, including Jay Shurley, concluded based on non-linguistic evidence that she had been intellectually disabled from birth, and argued this rendered it impossible to be completely certain about the utility of studying her language acquisition. During his sleep studies Shurley observed, among a few other persistent abnormalities in her sleep, a highly elevated number of sleep spindles, which are characteristic of people born with a severe intellectual disability. However, the linguists who studied Genie firmly believed that she possessed at least average intelligence at birth, and argued that the abuse and isolation she suffered during her childhood had left her functionally intellectually disabled. Curtiss specifically noted that some of Genie's linguistic capabilities, such as her clear ability to distinguish gender in her speech, were very atypical of someone with a congenital intellectual disability. Other linguists analyzing Genie's case, including Steven Pinker, have concurred with Curtiss' position.

The scientists acknowledged that Genie's extreme emotional difficulties may have contributed to delaying her acquisition and willingness to use a few specific pieces of grammar, and may have partially explained her very tacit demeanor when she began receiving care. Nonetheless, in Curtiss and Fromkin repeatedly maintained that her emotional profile could not have impeded her ability to acquire language; they pointed out that she had clearly progressed in other aspects of her psychological development and was generally happy during their testing, and argued it was extremely implausible that emotional difficulties could interfere with her grammar acquisition without affecting her ability to learn vocabulary. Several linguists, including Pinker and Derek Bickerton, accepted Curtiss and Fromkin's assessment while a few, including Stephen Laurence, questioned it but considered her case highly valuable. Other linguists, including Geoffrey Sampson, argued that the severity of her emotional difficulties made this extremely implausible and therefore negated much of the scientific significance ascribed to her case.

==== Assessment of Genie ====
Early accounts of Genie expressed varying degrees of optimism about her language acquisition, and in her dissertation Curtiss argued that, while Genie's speech was still considerably different from that of most people, her, "language performance often does not reflect her underlying linguistic ability". An independent 2006 review of Genie's case argued that Curtiss' dissertation displayed an unwarranted degree of positivity about Genie's progress and prognosis, pointing out that by the time of its completion Genie's language had clearly regressed from her treatment in foster care. Curtiss' accounts of Genie after her dissertation, starting in 1978, acknowledged that Genie's vocabulary had steadily broadened and argued that she clearly learned some basic grammar, but all had more negative evaluations of Genie's speech. In these writings, Curtiss concluded that she had never learned any meaningful amount of grammar. In later interviews Curtiss said that Genie could communicate messages using language but did not speak in real sentences, and Russ Rymer wrote that, based on conversations with Curtiss and documents she shared with him, she seemed to view the summer of 1972 as the point at which Genie's linguistic abilities plateaued.

An independent analysis of Genie's speech from Peter Jones, a linguistics professor at Sheffield Hallam University, argued that Curtiss' earlier accounts of Genie's speech, up to and including her dissertation, were more accurate than those from after 1977. He argued that in these later analyses Curtiss did not provide sufficient evidence for many of her later conclusions, saying that she neither examined the utterances she cited in significant detail nor presented them in a manner conducive to doing so, and in a few instances asserted that Curtiss' data outright contradicted her conclusions. Jones wrote that, despite the tone of Curtiss' later works and interviews, he found nothing either suggesting reevaluation of her earlier arguments or disavowal of any of her earlier conclusions. In addition, he wrote that Curtiss did not release enough information about Genie's speech from after mid-1975 to determine exactly what, if any, grammatical abilities she had lost, and that the complete lack of data from any time after early January 1978 rendered it impossible to determine the extent to which her language had regressed.

Although Jones said that the relatively small number of utterances Genie produced made it impossible to draw definite conclusions, in a 1995 paper he argued the discrepancies he noted demonstrated, "the post-(1977) account [of Genie's speech] is not so much based on reanalysis or reinterpretation of the data but on a highly selective and misleading misrepresentation of the earlier findings." [emphasis as in the original] This, in turn, left an unresolved tension between Curtiss' earlier and later analyses of Genie's language which he said meant that until Curtiss published a clarification of her works, "a definitive judgment on the character and extent of Genie's linguistic development still cannot be given." In a 2014 book Jones reiterated these arguments, noting that no additional outside analysis of Genie's utterances and Curtiss' papers had occurred since his paper. Others discussing Genie's case have cited Jones' arguments, and similarly questioned Curtiss' later analyses of Genie's grammar acquisition. To this point, neither Curtiss nor anyone else directly associated with Genie's case has responded to Jones' arguments.

== See also ==
- A Man Without Words

== Sources and further reading ==
- Aitchison, Jean (1989), The Articulate Mammal: An Introduction to Psycholinguistics (3 ed.), New York, NY: Routledge, ISBN 978-0-415-08395-9, OCLC 802910308.
- Benzaquén, Adriana Sylvia (2006), Encounters with Wild Children: Temptation and Disappointment in the Study of Human Nature, Montreal, Quebec: McGill-Queen's University Press, ISBN 978-0-7735-2972-4, OCLC 61427587.
- Bickerton, Derek (1990), Language and Species, Chicago, IL: University of Chicago Press, ISBN 978-0-226-04610-5, OCLC 802686883.
- Brown, Lisa J.; Jones, Peter E. (2014), Bringing Back the Child: Language Development after Extreme Deprivation, Newcastle upon Tyne, U. K.: Cambridge Scholars Publishing, ISBN 978-1-4438-5972-1, OCLC 893890618.
- Curtiss, Susan (1989), "The Independence and Task-Specificity of Language", in Bornstein, Marc H.; Bruner, Jerome S. (eds.), Interaction in Human Development, Crosscurrents in Contemporary Psychology Series, Hillside, NJ: Lawrence Earlbaum Associates, pp. 105–138, ISBN 978-0-8058-0035-7, OCLC 19127931.
- Curtiss, Susan (1977), Genie: A Psycholinguistic Study of a Modern-Day "Wild Child", Perspectives in Neurolinguistics and Psycholinguistics, Boston, MA: Academic Press, ISBN 978-0-12-196350-7, OCLC 3073433.
- Curtiss, Susan (1982), "Developmental dissociations of language and cognition" (PDF), in Obler, Loraine K.; Menn, Lise (eds.), Exceptional Language and Linguistics, Perspectives in Neurolinguistics, Neuropsychology, and Psycholinguistics, vol. 21, New York, NY: Academic Press, pp. 285–312, doi:10.1017/S0022226700010197, ISBN 978-0-12-523680-5, OCLC 8410214, S2CID 143972838.
- Curtiss, Susan (1988a), "The special talent of grammar acquisition" (PDF), in Obler, Loraine K.; Fein, Deborah (eds.), The Exceptional Brain: Neuropsychology of Talent and Special Abilities, Guilford, NY: Guilford Press, pp. 364–386, ISBN 978-0-89862-701-5, OCLC 14719594.
- Curtiss, Susan (1988b), "Abnormal language acquisition and the modularity of language" (PDF), in Newmeyer, Frederick J. (ed.), Linguistics: The Cambridge Survey: Volume 2, Linguistic Theory: Extensions and Implications, vol. 2, New York, NY: Cambridge University Press, pp. 96–116, doi:10.1016/0013-4694(86)90177-X, ISBN 978-0-511-62105-5, OCLC 18836853.
- Curtiss, Susan (1994), "Language as a cognitive system: its independence and selective vulnerability" (PDF), in Otero, Carlos Peregrín (ed.), Noam Chomsky: Critical Assessments/ Volume 1, Linguistics, vol. 1, New York, NY: Routledge, pp. 227–228, ISBN 978-0-415-09992-9, OCLC 717086585.
- Curtiss, Susan; Fromkin, Victoria A.; Rigler, David; Rigler, Marilyn; Krashen, Stephen D. (1975), "An update on the linguistic development of Genie" (PDF), in Dato, Daniel P. (ed.), Developmental Psycholinguistics: Theory and Applications, Georgetown University Round Table on Languages and Linguistics, Washington, D. C.: Georgetown University Press, pp. 145–153, ISBN 978-0-87840-110-9, OCLC 2114555.
- Curtiss, Susan; Krashen, Stephen D.; Fromkin, Victoria A.; Rigler, David; Rigler, Marilyn (1973), "Language acquisition after the critical period: Genie as of April, 1973" (PDF), in Binnick, Robert I. (ed.), Papers from the Ninth Regional Meeting Chicago Linguistic Society, Chicago, IL: University of Chicago, Department of Linguistics, pp. 98–103, OCLC 489813646.
- de Groot, Annette M. B. (2011), Language and Cognition in Bilinguals and Multilinguals: An Introduction, New York, NY: Psychology Press, ISBN 978-0-203-84122-8, OCLC 701718082.
- Goldin-Meadow, Susan (1982), "The resilience of recursion: a study of a communication system developed without a conventional language model" (PDF), in Wanner, Eric; Gleitman, Lila R. (eds.), Language Acquisition: The State of the Art, New York, NY: Cambridge University Press, pp. 51–77, ISBN 978-0-521-23817-5, OCLC 8409828.
- Newton, Michael (2002), Savage Girls and Wild Boys, New York, NY: Macmillan, ISBN 978-0-312-42335-3, OCLC 54696995.
- Pinker, Steven (2007), The Language Instinct: How The Mind Creates Language (3 ed.), New York, NY: HarperCollins, ISBN 978-0-06-095833-6, OCLC 263595357.
- Reynolds, Cecil R.; Fletcher-Janzen, Elaine, eds. (2004), Concise Encyclopedia of Special Education: A Reference for the Education of the Handicapped and Other Exceptional Children and Adults (2 ed.), Hoboken, NJ: John Wiley & Sons, ISBN 978-0-471-65251-9, OCLC 46975017.
- Rymer, Russ (1993), Genie: a Scientific Tragedy, New York, NY: Harper Perennial, ISBN 978-0-06-092465-2, OCLC 29616957.
- Sampson, Geoffrey (1997), Educating Eve: The 'Language Instinct' Debate, London, UK: Continuum Publishing, ISBN 978-0-304-33908-2, OCLC 490496141.
- Sampson, Geoffrey (2005), The 'Language Instinct' Debate: Revised Edition, London, UK: Continuum Publishing, ISBN 978-1-4411-0764-0, OCLC 745866730.
