= Nina Hyams =

American linguist (born 1952)

Nina Hyams (born 1952) is a distinguished research professor emeritus in linguistics at the University of California in Los Angeles.

== Education and career ==
Hyams received her PhD in linguistics in 1983 from Graduate Center of the City University of New York, with a dissertation entitled, The acquisition of parameterized grammars. It was published by Springer in 1986, and it remains a widely cited and influential classic.

Her primary research area since her dissertation is grammatical development in first language acquisition. She is particularly noted for her research into the acquisition of null subjects.

In 2020 she was inducted as a Fellow in the Linguistic Society of America.

== Selected publications ==
- Hyams, Nina M. (1986). Language acquisition and the theory of parameters. D. Reidel Pub. Co. ISBN 978-90-277-2218-8.
- Hyams, Nina; "The Theory of Parameters and Syntactic Development", a chapter within Roeper, Thomas; Williams, Edwin (1987). Parameter setting. Springer. ISBN 978-90-277-2315-4.
- Hyams, Nina; Kenneth Wexler (Summer 1993). "On the Grammatical Basis of Null Subjects in Child Language". Linguistic Inquiry. 24 (3). MIT Press: 421–459. JSTOR 4178822.
- Hyams, Nina; Sigridur Sigurjónsdóttir (1990). "The Development of "Long-Distance Anaphora": A Cross-Linguistic Comparison with Special Reference to Icelandic". Language Acquisition. 1 (1). Taylor & Francis, Ltd.: 57–93. doi:10.1207/s15327817la0101_3. JSTOR 20011342.
