= Victoria Fromkin =

American linguist (1923–2000)

- Born: Victoria Alexandra Landish; May 16, 1923; Passaic, New Jersey
- Died: February 19, 2000 (aged 76)
- Spouse: Jack Fromkin (m. 1948)

Academic background
- Education: University of California, Berkeley (B.A.); University of California, Los Angeles (M.A., Ph.D.)
- Thesis: Some phonetic specifications of linguistic units: an electromyographic investigation (1965)

Academic work
- Discipline: Linguistics
- Institutions: UCLA
- Doctoral students: Larry Hyman

Victoria Alexandra Fromkin (née Landish; May 16, 1923 – January 19, 2000) was an American linguist who taught at UCLA. She studied slips of the tongue, mishearing, and other speech errors, which she applied to phonology, the study of how the sounds of a language are organized in the mind.

== Biography ==
Fromkin was born in Passaic, New Jersey as Victoria Alexandra Landish on May 16, 1923. She earned a bachelor's degree in economics from the University of California, Berkeley in 1944. She married Jack Fromkin, a childhood friend from Passaic, in 1948, and they settled in Los Angeles, California. She decided to head back to school to study linguistics in her late thirties. She enrolled at UCLA, received her master's in 1963 and her Ph.D. in 1965. Her thesis was entitled, "Some phonetic specifications of linguistic units: an electromyographic investigation". That same year, Fromkin joined the faculty of the linguistics department at UCLA.

Her line of research mainly dealt with speech errors and slips of the tongue. She collected more than 12,000 examples of slips of the tongue, which were analyzed in a number of scholarly publications, notably her 1971 Language article and an edited volume, Speech Errors as Linguistic Evidence.

From 1971 to 1975, Fromkin was part of a team of linguistic researchers studying the speech of the "feral child" known as Genie. Genie had spent the first 13 years of her life in severe isolation, and Fromkin and her associates hoped that her case would illuminate the process of language acquisition after the critical period. However, the study ended after rancorous disputes over Genie's care, and the loss of funding from the National Institute of Mental Health. Fromkin published several papers about Genie's linguistic development, and her PhD student, Susan Curtiss, wrote a dissertation about Genie's linguistic development under Fromkin's supervision.

In 1974, Fromkin was commissioned by the producers of the children's television series Land of the Lost to create a constructed language for a species of primitive cavemen/primates called the Pakuni. Fromkin developed a 300-word vocabulary and syntax for the series, and translated scripts into her created Pakuni language for the series' first two seasons.

Fromkin created another constructed language for the vampires in the sci-fi movie Blade.

She became the first woman in the University of California system to be Vice Chancellor of Graduate Programs. She held this position from 1980 to 1989. She was elected President of the Linguistic Society of America in 1985. Fromkin was also chairwoman of the board of governors of the Academy of Aphasia. She was elected to membership in the National Academy of Sciences in 1996.

Fromkin died at the age of 76 on January 19, 2000 from colon cancer. The Linguistic Society of America established the "Victoria A. Fromkin Prize for Distinguished Service" award in her honor in 2001. This award recognizes individuals who have performed extraordinary service to the discipline and to the Society throughout their career.

== Research ==
Fromkin contributed to the area of linguistics known as speech errors. She created "Fromkin's Speech Error Database", for which data collection is ongoing.

Fromkin recorded nine different types of speech errors. The following are examples of each:

- Lexical:
  - Target Utterance: A fifty-pound bag of dog food
  - Error Utterance: A fifty-pound dog of bag food.
- Morphological:
  - Target Utterance: A cameraman who wants to make a report about the horserace.
  - Error Utterance: A cameraman who WANT to er make a reportage about the horserace who WANTS to make a reportage about the horse race.
- Morphosyntactic:
  - Target Utterance: We began to collect a lot of data to determine what they may mean.
  - Error Utterance: We began to collect a lot of data to determine what they may MEANT.
- Phonological:
  - Target Utterance: A bread bun
  - Error Utterance: A BRUN
- Phonological/lexical:
  - Target Utterance: 280 days as compared to
  - Error Utterance: 280 days as composed to
- Phonologic/Morphologic:
  - Target Utterance: DISTINGUISHED TEACHING award
  - Error Utterance: DISTEACHING TINGWER award
- Phrasal:
  - Target Utterance: and then they start painting/need t'start painting
  - Error Utterance: ...and then they START NEED T'...need t'start painting.
- Syntactic:
  - Target Utterance: a university that celebrated its 50th anniversary a couple of years ago
  - Error Utterance: a university that IS celebratING its 50th anniversary a couple of years ago
- Tip-of-the-Tongue:
  - Target Utterance: Cherokee
  - Error Utterance: it starts with a "j"

Fromkin theorized that slips of the tongue can occur at many levels including syntactic, phrasal, lexical or semantic, morphological, phonological. She also believed that slips of the tongue could occur as many different process procedures. The different forms were:

- Addition: Someone wants to say, "bomb scare" but instead says, "bomb square."
- Deletion: Someone wants to say, "I hope you use the same brush every day" but instead says, "I hope you use the rush every day."
- Exchange: Wanting to say, "can you sign on the line" but instead says, "cas you nign on the line?"
- Substitution: Someone wants to say, "a vote for the guarneri quartet came in" but instead says, "a vote for the guarneri quartAte cAme in."

Fromkin's research helps support the argument that language processing is not modular. The argument for modularity claims that language is localized, domain-specific, mandatory, fast, and encapsulated. Her research on slips of the tongue has demonstrated that when people make slips of the tongue it usually happens on the same level, indicating that each level has a distinct place in the person's brain. Phonemes switch with phonemes, stems with stems, and morphemes switch with other morphemes.

== Books ==
- Fromkin, V. (Ed.) (1980). Errors in linguistic performance: Slips of the tongue, ear, pen, and hand. San Francisco: Academic Press. ISBN 0-12-268980-1.
- Fromkin, V. (Ed.) (2000). Linguistics: An Introduction to Linguistic Theory. Malden, MA: Blackwell Publishing. ISBN 0-631-19711-7.
- Fromkin, V., Rodman, R., & Hyams, N. (2007). An Introduction to Language (8th ed.). Boston, MA: Thomson Wadsworth. ISBN 978-1-4130-1773-1.
- Fromkin, V., Rodman, R., & Hyams, N. (2011). An Introduction to Language (9th ed.). Boston, USA: Cengage Learning Wadsworth. ISBN 978-1-4282-6392-5.
