= Dedre Gentner =

American psychologist

- Born: c. 1944 (age 81–82)
- Education: University of California, San Diego
- Scientific career
- Fields: Psychology
- Workplaces: Northwestern University
- Thesis: Evidence for the Psychological Reality of Semantic Components (1974)

Dedre Dariel Gentner (born c. 1944) is an American cognitive and developmental psychologist. She is the Alice Gabriel Twight Professor of Psychology at Northwestern University, and a leading researcher in the study of analogical reasoning.

== Works ==
She is a leading researcher in the study of analogical reasoning. She developed the structure-mapping theory of analogy and similarity, which has wide application. As her APA Distinguished Scientific Contribution Award citation (2016) states: “For achievements in research and theory in cognitive psychology and cognitive development, especially for developing the structure-mapping theory of analogy and similarity, for highlighting and elucidating analogy as a central learning mechanism and for describing and explaining the development and role of relational language. These ideas are vital underpinnings of a science of learning, fostering the creation of powerful learning tools that build on foundational human thinking skills and enabling new insights into human development.” Her work on structure-mapping theory was foundational for the development of the structure mapping engine by Ken Forbus. This involves the mapping of knowledge from one domain into another or from the base to the target for the purpose of guiding reasoning, to develop conjectures, and to generalize experiences into abstract schema. Gentner also maintained that this theory of analogy can be used to model other subprocesses in analogical reasoning. She also coined the kind world hypothesis, claiming that superficial properties usually tell a lot about the structural features of the object: "If something looks like a tiger, it probably is a tiger". For this reason, she argued that due to the environment in which humans have evolved, risk avoidance became a top priority, so that while overlooking a deep analogy may be unfortunate, overlooking a real danger may be catastrophic.

Gentner has contributed in developing a sophisticated model of analogy use - the manner in which new situations are dealt with through adaptation based on previous experiences or similar situations that transpired in the past.

Gentner's contributions to cognitive theory are in three arenas: analogy (including similarity and metaphor); language development; and interactions between language and cognition.

Gentner was awarded the 2016 Rumelhart Prize for Contributions to the Theoretical Foundations of Human Cognition.

== Early life and education ==
Gentner was born in San Diego, California. She received her bachelor's degree in physics from UC Berkeley during the 1970s and did graduate work in physics at the University of Chicago, before discovering the field of cognitive psychology. After a year studying cognitive science at U. Chicago, Gentner taught first grade for two years in Ghana, sparking an enduring interest in cognitive development. She then entered the graduate program at UC San Diego working with Don Norman and David Rumelhart, receiving her PhD in 1974. She taught at the University of Washington, served as Research Scientist at Bolt Beranek and Newman, and taught at the University of Illinois at Urbana-Champaign before joining Northwestern University in 1990, her current position. Gentner co-founded Northwestern's Cognitive Science Program and the Undergraduate Major in Cognitive Science in 1991-92 and was Director of the Cognitive Science Program from 1991 to 2015. During this time the Program grew to over 100 faculty, spanning Psychology, Linguistics, Philosophy, Artificial Intelligence, Learning Science, Neuroscience, Anthropology, Communication Sciences and Disorders, and Music Cognition.

== Awards and fellowships ==
Gentner received an Alexander von Humboldt Research Award in 2011. She received the Distinguished Scientific Contribution Award from the American Psychological Association in 2016. That same year, she was awarded the 2016 Rumelhart Prize for Contributions to the Theoretical Foundations of Human Cognition. She is a Fellow of the Cognitive Science Society, the American Association for Arts and Sciences, the American Association for the Advancement of Science, the Cognitive Development Society, and the Society for Experimental Psychology. She has been a fellow at the Center for Advanced Study in the Behavioral Sciences at Stanford University (1999-2000), at the Rockefeller Institute in Bellagio, Italy (2006), and at the Humboldt Foundation (Delmenhorst, Germany).

She is a member of the U. S. National Academy of Sciences.

== Publications ==
The following are in-print books by Gentner; see her home page for further publications.

- The Analogical Mind: Perspectives from Cognitive Science by Dedre Gentner (Editor), Keith J. Holyoak (Editor), Boicho Kokinov (Editor), ISBN 0-262-57139-0
- Language in Mind: Advances in the Study of Language and Thought, by Dedre Gentner (Editor), Susan Goldin-Meadow (Editor), ISBN 0-262-57163-3
- Mental Models (Cognitive Science (Lawrence Erlbaum Associates).), by Albert L. Stevens, Dedre Gentner, ISBN 0-89859-242-9
- Proceedings Thirteenth Annual Conference of the Cognitive Science Society, by Cognitive Science Society, Kristian J. Hammond (Editor), Dedre Gentner (Editor), ISBN 0-8058-1138-9

== See also ==
- Structure mapping engine
