= Rumelhart Prize =

Cognitive science prize

The David E. Rumelhart Prize for Contributions to the Theoretical Foundations of Human Cognition was founded in 2001 in honor of the cognitive scientist David Rumelhart to introduce the equivalent of a Nobel Prize for cognitive science. It is awarded annually to "an individual or collaborative team making a significant contemporary contribution to the theoretical foundations of human cognition". The annual award is presented at the Cognitive Science Society meeting, where the recipient gives a lecture and receives a check for $100,000. At the conclusion of the ceremony, the next year's award winner is announced. The award is funded by the Robert J. Glushko and Pamela Samuelson Foundation.

The Rumelhart Prize committee is independent of the Cognitive Science Society. However, the society provides a large and interested audience for the awards.

== Selection Committee ==
As of 2022, the selection committee for the prize consisted of:

- Richard Cooper (chair)
- Dedre Gentner
- Robert J. Glushko
- Tania Lombrozo
- Steven T. Piantadosi
- Jesse Snedeker

== Recipients ==
Year	Recipients	Key contributions	Affiliated institute(s)
2001	Geoffrey E. Hinton	Application of the backpropagation algorithm, Boltzmann machines	University of Toronto, Google AI, University of California, San Diego, Carnegie Mellon University, University College London
2002	Richard M. Shiffrin	Atkinson-Shiffrin memory model, Retrieving Effectively From Memory model	Indiana University
2003	Aravind Joshi	Tree-adjoining grammar formalism, Centering Theory	University of Pennsylvania
2004	John Anderson	Adaptive Control of Thought—Rational theory	Carnegie Mellon University, Yale University
2005	Paul Smolensky	Integrated Connectionist/Symbolic (ICS) architecture, Optimality Theory, Harmonic Grammar	Johns Hopkins University, Microsoft Research, University of California, San Diego
2006	Roger Shepard	Non-metric multidimensional scaling, Universal Law of Generalization, theories on mental rotation	Stanford University
2007	Jeffrey L. Elman	TRACE model, Simple Recurrent Neural Network (SRNN)	University of California, San Diego
2008	Shimon Ullman	Theories of motion perception, application of visual routines, saliency maps	Weizmann Institute of Science, Israel, Massachusetts Institute of Technology
2009	Susan Carey	Theories of conceptual development and language development, fast mapping	Harvard University, Massachusetts Institute of Technology, New York University
2010	Jay McClelland	Parallel Distributed Processing, application of connectionist models in cognition	Stanford University, Carnegie Mellon University, University of California, San Diego
2011	Judea Pearl	The probabilistic approach to artificial intelligence, belief propagation	University of California, Los Angeles, Princeton University, Electronic Memories, Inc.
2012	Peter Dayan	Application of Bayesian methods to computational neuroscience, Q-learning algorithm, wake-sleep algorithm, Helmholtz machine	Max Planck Institute for Biological Cybernetics, University College London, Massachusetts Institute of Technology
2013	Linda B. Smith	Dynamic systems approach to cognitive development, early word learning, shape bias	Indiana University
2014	Ray Jackendoff	Conceptual semantics, generative theory of tonal music	Tufts University, Brandeis University
2015	Michael I. Jordan	Latent Dirichlet allocation, variational methods for approximate inference, expectation-maximization algorithm	University of California, Berkeley, University of California, San Diego, Massachusetts Institute of Technology
2016	Dedre Gentner	Structure-Mapping Theory of analogical reasoning, theories of mental models, kind world hypothesis	Northwestern University, University of Illinois at Urbana-Champaign, Bolt Beranek and Newman, Inc, University of Washington
2017	Lila Gleitman	Theories of language acquisition and developmental psycholinguistics, notably the syntactic bootstrapping	University of Pennsylvania
2018	Michael Tanenhaus	Theories of language comprehension, notably the visual world paradigm	University of Rochester, Wayne State University
2019	Michelene Chi	Self-explanation, ICAP theory of active learning	Arizona State University,
2020	Stanislas Dehaene	Theories of numerical cognition, neural basis of reading, neural correlates of consciousness	INSERM, Collège de France
2021	Susan Goldin-Meadow	Innateness of language, gestural systems of communication	University of Chicago
2022	Michael Tomasello	Functional theories of language development, uniqueness of human social cognition, namely the collective intentionality.	Duke University, Max Planck Institute for Evolutionary Anthropology, University of Leipzig, Emory University
2023	Nick Chater	Bayesian Models of Cognition and Reasoning, Simplicity theory, 'Now-or-Never' Bottleneck in Language Acquisition	University of Warwick, University College London, University of Edinburgh, University of Oxford
2024	Alison Gopnik	Effect of Language on Thought, Development of a Theory of Mind, Causal Learning	University of California, Berkeley, University of Toronto

== See also ==
- List of psychology awards
- List of computer science awards
- List of social sciences awards
- List of prizes known as the Nobel of a field
- List of awards named after people
- Turing Award
- The Brain Prize
- Jean Nicod Prize
