= Jennifer Culbertson =

Professor at University of Edinburgh

- Title: Professor
- Website: jennifer-culbertson.github.io

Jennifer Culbertson is a professor in the department of Linguistics and English Language at the University of Edinburgh. She is a founding member of the Centre for Language Evolution, with her research focusing on how typological universals are shaped by properties of human cognition. Culbertson is best known for her work investigating universals of word order and morphological categories using the experimental method of Artificial Language Learning.

Culbertson gained her PhD in 2010 from Johns Hopkins University, with her dissertation being awarded the Robert J. Glushko Prize for Outstanding Dissertations in Cognitive Science. After taking up a Chancellor's Fellowship at the University of Edinburgh, she gained the role of reader in 2018. She was chosen for the Young Academy of Europe in 2019, She is a member of the Cognitive Science Society, and was a co-chair of the 2022 Toronto conference.

== Cognitive biases and Language Universals ==
Culbertson has collaborated with David Adger, Simon Kirby and various others to investigate whether we have cognitive biases towards certain linguistic structures when learning and using language, and how the existence of these biases can explain cross-linguistic statistical tendencies. One such statistical tendency is the order of elements in the noun phrase. Cross-linguistically, the most common order of these elements is one that is homomorphic - containing the adjective closest to the noun, followed by the number and then the determiner. Possible explanations behind this tendency have been debated, ranging from historical accidents (Dunn et al., 2011) to language change processes unrelated to cognition (Bybee, 2008). Martin et al. (2024) investigated whether this ordering is most common cross-linguistically, as it is easiest to learn. This was done by testing whether speakers of both English, which primarily employs suffixes, and Kîîtharaka, a language which overwhelmingly prefers prefixes, were more likely to use a homomorphic ordering than other orderings when learning an artificial language. They found that speakers of both languages overwhelmingly used a homomorphic ordering than others, even if this went against the one used by their native language. This finding suggests that there are universal cognitive biases for certain linguistic structures (i.e. suffixes v. prefixes), and that these biases can explain patterns found in linguistic typology.

== Selected publications ==
- Demuth, Katherine; Culbertson, Jennifer; Alter, Jennifer (June 2006). "Word-minimality, Epenthesis and Coda Licensing in the Early Acquisition of English". Language and Speech. 49 (2): 137–173. doi:10.1177/00238309060490020201.
- Culbertson, Jennifer; Smolensky, Paul; Legendre, Géraldine (March 2012). "Learning biases predict a word order universal". Cognition. 122 (3): 306–329. doi:10.1016/j.cognition.2011.10.017. PMID 22208785.
- Culbertson, Jennifer; Schouwstra, Marieke; Kirby, Simon (2020). "From the world to word order: Deriving biases in noun phrase order from statistical properties of the world". Language. doi:10.1353/lan.0.0245. hdl:20.500.11820/0e1e1fb0-0771-4343-8c1f-5ad0883c9a37.
- Saldana, Carmen; Oseki, Yohei; Culbertson, Jennifer (June 2021). "Cross-linguistic patterns of morpheme order reflect cognitive biases: An experimental study of case and number morphology". Journal of Memory and Language. 118 104204. doi:10.1016/j.jml.2020.104204. hdl:20.500.11820/0cf59ea6-8ed0-4319-9f36-a78adebafb5a.
- Martin, Alexander; Adger, David; Abels, Klaus; Kanampiu, Patrick; Culbertson, Jennifer (March 2024). "A Universal Cognitive Bias in Word Order: Evidence From Speakers Whose Language Goes Against It". Psychological Science. 35 (3): 304–311. doi:10.1177/09567976231222836. hdl:20.500.11820/e3b08530-a64a-4489-87c2-614cdcd772ec. PMID 38386358.
