= Wayne Gray =

Wayne Gray may refer to:

- Wayne Gray (footballer) (born 1980), English professional footballer
- Wayne D. Gray, cognitive science professor
