= ADCOP =

ADCOP may refer to:

- Asymmetric distributed constraint optimization
- Abu Dhabi Crude Oil Pipeline, also called Habshan–Fujairah oil pipeline
