= Mental Models =

1983 book

Mental Models is a book published by Lawrence Erlbaum Associates, Inc., in 1983 ISBN 0-89859-242-9. It was edited by Dedre Gentner and Albert L. Stevens, both employees of Bolt, Beranek and Newman, Inc. at the time. It appeared at about the same time as a book by the same name by Philip Johnson-Laird. According to the acknowledgment of the book, it resulted from a workshop on mental models held at the University of California, San Diego in October 1980, that was jointly sponsored by the Office of Naval Research and the Sloan Foundation.

== Chapters ==
1. Some Observations on Mental Models — Donald A. Norman, UCSD
  Dr. Norman describes the properties of mental models — that they can be contradictory, incomplete, superstitious, erroneous, and unstable, varying in time. So the job of system designers is to help users form an accurate and useful mental model of a system. And the job of researchers is to set up experiments to learn to understand actual mental models, even though they may be messy and incomplete.
2. Phenomenology and the Evolution of Intuition — Andrea diSessa, MIT
3. Surrogates and Mappings: Two Kinds of Conceptual Models for Interactive Devices — Richard M. Young, Medical Research Council, Applied Psychology Unit, Cambridge, England
4. Qualitative Reasoning About Space and Motion — Kenneth D. Forbus, MIT
5. The Role of Problem Representation in Physics — Jill H. Larkin, Carnegie Mellon University
6. Flowing Waters or Teeming Crowds:Mental Models of Electricity — Dedre Gentner, Bolt Beranek and Newman, and Donald R. Gentner, UCSD
7. Human Reasoning About a Simple Physical System — Michael D. Williams, Xerox PARC, James D. Hollan, and Albert L. Stevens, Bolt Beranek and Newman
8. Assumptions and Ambiguities in Mechanistic Mental Models — Johan de Kleer and John Seely Brown, Xerox PARC
9. Understanding Micronesian Navigation — Edwin Hutchins, Navy Personnel Research and Development Center
10. Conceptual Entities — James G. Greeno, University of Pittsburgh
11. Using the Method of Fibres in Mecho to Calculate Radii of Gyration — Alan Bundy, University of Edinburgh
12. When Heat and Temperature Were One — Marianne Wiser and Susan Carey, MIT
13. Naive Theories of Motion — Michael McCloskey, Johns Hopkins University
14. A Conceptual Model Discussed by Galileo and Used Intuitively by Physics Students — John Clement, University of Massachusetts Amherst

== Reception ==
Upon release, Mental Models received reviews from journals such as American Anthropologist. The American Journal of Psychology reviewed the work, stating that it would be of interest to "those who are concerned with what is new in cognitive science". Instructional Science also wrote a review, writing "Mental Models succeeds as an introduction to the vigorous, multidisciplinary attack on the ethereal problems surrounding knowledge representation. Whether mental models will prove their mettle in the earthly settings of instructional applications remains an open question."
