= Psycholinguistics =

Study of relations between psychology and language

Psycholinguistics or psychology of language is the study of the interrelation between linguistic factors and other aspects of mind and brain. The discipline is mainly concerned with the psychological and neurobiological mechanisms that enable humans to learn, comprehend, and produce language.

Psycholinguistics is concerned with the cognitive faculties and processes that are necessary to produce the grammatical constructions of language. It is also concerned with the perception of these constructions by a listener.

Initial forays into psycholinguistics were in the philosophical and educational fields, mainly due to their location in departments other than applied sciences (e.g., cohesive data on how the human brain functioned). Modern research makes use of biology, neuroscience, cognitive science, linguistics, and information science to study how the mind-brain processes language, and less so the known processes of social sciences, human development, communication theories, and infant development, among others.

There are several subdisciplines with non-invasive techniques for studying the neurological workings of the brain. For example, neurolinguistics has become a field in its own right, and developmental psycholinguistics, as a branch of psycholinguistics, concerns itself with a child's ability to learn language.

== Areas of study ==
Psycholinguistics is an interdisciplinary field that consists of researchers from a variety of different backgrounds, including psychology, cognitive science, linguistics, speech and language pathology, and discourse analysis. Psycholinguists study how people acquire and use language, according to the following main ways:

1. language development: how do children learn language?
2. language comprehension: how do people understand language?
3. language production: how do people speak or sign language?
4. second language acquisition: how do people who already know one language acquire another one?

A researcher interested in language comprehension may study word recognition during reading, to examine the processes involved in the extraction of orthographic, morphological, phonological, and semantic information from patterns in printed text. A researcher interested in language production might study how words are prepared to be spoken starting from the conceptual or semantic level (this concerns connotation, and possibly can be examined through the conceptual framework concerned with the semantic differential). Developmental psycholinguists study infants' and children's ability to learn and process language.

Psycholinguistics further divide their studies according to the different components that make up human language.

Linguistics-related areas include:

- Phonetics and phonology are the study of speech sounds. Within psycholinguistics, research focuses on how the brain processes and understands these sounds.
- Morphology is the study of word structures, especially between related words (such as dog and dogs) and the formation of words based on rules (such as plural formation).
- Syntax is the study of how words are combined to form sentences.
- Semantics deals with the meaning of words and sentences. Where syntax is concerned with the formal structure of sentences, semantics deals with the actual meaning of sentences.
- Pragmatics is concerned with the role of context in the interpretation of meaning.
- Linguistic relativity is a principle suggesting that the structure of a language influences its speakers' worldview or cognition, and thus individuals' languages determine or shape their perceptions of the world.

== History ==
In seeking to understand the properties of language acquisition, psycholinguistics has roots in debates regarding innate versus acquired behaviors (both in biology and psychology). For some time, the concept of an innate trait was something that was not recognized in studying the psychology of the individual. However, with the redefinition of innateness as time progressed, behaviors considered innate could once again be analyzed as behaviors that interacted with the psychological aspect of an individual. After the diminished popularity of the behaviorist model, ethology reemerged as a leading train of thought within psychology, allowing the subject of language, an innate human behavior, to be examined once more within the scope of psychology.

=== Origin of "psycholinguistics" ===
The theoretical framework for psycholinguistics ostensibly began to be developed near the end of the 19th century as the "psychology of language". The work of Edward Thorndike and Frederic Bartlett laid the foundations of what would come to be known as "psycholinguistics."

The use of the term "psycholinguistic" is first encountered in adjective form in psychologist Jacob Kantor 1936 book An Objective Psychology of Grammar.

The term "psycholinguistics" came into wider usage in 1946 when Kantor's student Nicholas Pronko published an article entitled "Psycholinguistics: A Review". Pronko's intention was to unify related theoretical approaches under a single name. The term was used for the first time to talk about an interdisciplinary field "that could be coherent", in Charles E. Osgood and Thomas A. Sebeok's Psycholinguistics: A Survey of Theory and Research Problems (1954).

== Theories ==
=== Language acquisition ===
Though there is still much debate, there are two main positions on children's language development:

- the behaviorist perspective, whereby all language must be learned by the child; and
- the innatist perspective, which believes that the abstract system of language cannot be learned, but that humans possess an innate language faculty or access to what has been called "universal grammar".

The innatist perspective began in 1959 with Noam Chomsky's critical review of B.F. Skinner's Verbal Behavior (1957). This review helped start what has been called the cognitive revolution in psychology. Chomsky posited that humans possess a special, innate ability for language, and that complex syntactic features, such as recursion, are "hard-wired" in the brain. These abilities are thought to be beyond the grasp of even the most intelligent and social non-humans. When Chomsky asserted that children acquiring a language have a vast search space to explore among all possible human grammars, there was no evidence that children received sufficient input to learn all the rules of their language. Hence, there must be some other innate mechanism that endows humans with the ability to learn language. According to the "innateness hypothesis", such a language faculty is what defines human language and makes that faculty different from even the most sophisticated forms of animal communication.

The field of linguistics and psycholinguistics has since been defined by pro-and-con reactions to Chomsky. The view in favor of Chomsky still holds that the human ability to use language (specifically the ability to use recursion) is qualitatively different from any sort of animal ability.

The view that language must be learned was especially popular before 1960 and is well represented by the mentalistic theories of Jean Piaget and the empiricist Rudolf Carnap. Likewise, the behaviorist school of psychology puts forth the point of view that language is a behavior shaped by conditioned response; hence it is learned. The view that language can be learned has had a recent resurgence inspired by emergentism. This view challenges the "innate" view as scientifically unfalsifiable; that is to say, it cannot be tested. With the increase in computer technology since the 1980s, researchers have been able to simulate language acquisition using neural network models.

=== Language comprehension ===
The structures and uses of language are related to the formation of ontological insights. Some see this system as "structured cooperation between language-users" who use conceptual and semantic difference in order to exchange meaning and knowledge, as well as give meaning to language, thereby examining and describing "semantic processes bound by a 'stopping' constraint which are not cases of ordinary deferring." Deferring is normally done for a reason, and a rational person is always disposed to defer if there is good reason.

The theory of the "semantic differential" supposes universal distinctions, such as:

- Typicality: that included scales such as "regular–rare", "typical–exclusive";
- Reality: "imaginary–real", "evident–fantastic", "abstract–concrete";
- Complexity: "complex–simple", "unlimited–limited", "mysterious–usual";
- Improvement or Organization: "regular–spasmodic", "constant–changeable", "organized–disorganized", "precise–indefinite";
- Stimulation: "interesting–boring", "trivial–new".

==== Reading ====
One question in the realm of language comprehension is how people understand sentences as they read (i.e., sentence processing). Experimental research has spawned several theories about the architecture and mechanisms of sentence comprehension. These theories are typically concerned with the types of information, contained in the sentence, that the reader can use to build meaning and the point at which that information becomes available to the reader. Issues such as "modular" versus "interactive" processing have been theoretical divides in the field.

A modular view of sentence processing assumes that the stages involved in reading a sentence function independently as separate modules. These modules have limited interaction with one another. For example, one influential theory of sentence processing, the "garden-path theory", states that syntactic analysis takes place first. Under this theory, as the reader is reading a sentence, he or she creates the simplest structure possible, to minimize effort and cognitive load. This is done without any input from semantic analysis or context-dependent information. Hence, in the sentence "The evidence examined by the lawyer turned out to be unreliable", by the time the reader gets to the word "examined" he or she has committed to a reading of the sentence in which the evidence is examining something because it is the simplest parsing. This commitment is made even though it results in an implausible situation: evidence cannot examine something. Under this "syntax first" theory, semantic information is processed at a later stage. It is only later that the reader will recognize that he or she needs to revise the initial parsing into one in which "the evidence" is being examined. In this example, readers typically recognize their mistake by the time they reach "by the lawyer" and must go back and reevaluate the sentence. This reanalysis is costly and contributes to slower reading times. A 2024 study found that during self-paced reading tasks, participants progressively read faster and recalled information more accurately, suggesting that task adaptation is driven by learning processes rather than by declining motivation.

In contrast to the modular view, an interactive theory of sentence processing, such as a constraint-based lexical approach assumes that all available information contained within a sentence can be processed at any time. Under an interactive view, the semantics of a sentence (such as plausibility) can come into play early on to help determine the structure of a sentence. Hence, in the sentence above, the reader would be able to make use of plausibility information in order to assume that "the evidence" is being examined instead of doing the examining. There are data to support both modular and interactive views; which view is correct is debatable.

When reading, saccades can cause the mind to skip over words because it does not see them as important to the sentence, and the mind completely omits it from the sentence or supplies the wrong word in its stead. This can be seen in "Paris in the the Spring". This is a common psychological test, where the mind will often skip the second "the", especially when there is a line break in between the two.

=== Language production ===
This focus concerns how people speak, sign, or write language. One of the most effective ways to see how people represent and retrieve the sounds and meanings of words and apply language rules is by collecting and analyzing speech errors. Research on speech errors studies tip-of-the-tongue states; fluency problems such as false starts, repetition, reformulation, and pauses between words or phrases; and slips of the tongue. Slips can involve various kinds of linguistic segments. These can be as small as phonetic features (such as voicing in the error "glear plue sky," where the voiced feature of the [b] sound in blue exchanged places with the unvoiced feature of the [k] sound in clear) or as big as whole phrases (like in the error "in one ear and gone tomorrow," where the idioms in one ear and out the other and here today and gone tomorrow were blended). Also, slips show a variety of changes of an intended utterance. Spoonerisms, for example, are exchanges of parts of words (like in the error "shake a tower" for take a shower). Speech errors can also show the substitution of one segment for another (like in the error "Don't burn your toes" when the speaker intended fingers; "I got whipped cream on my mushroom" when the speaker intended mustache). Anticipation or perseveration can also affect segments (e.g., "a case of ice" where the [s] sound is copied upstream, or "a cake of ike" where the [k] sound is copied downstream). Segments can also shift (like in the error "easy enoughly," where the function morpheme -ly moved to a different word.

Phenomena such as those summarized above have significant implications for understanding how language is produced.

1. Sentences are not fully planned before a speaker starts talking: Sound and word exchanges show that the planning window varies for different sized segments. Rather, their language faculty is constantly tapped during speech production. This is accounted for by the limitation of working memory.
2. The lexicon is organized semantically and phonologically: substitution errors show that lexicon is organized not only by its meaning, but also its form.
3. Morphologically complex words are assembled: errors involving blending within a word reflect that there seems to be a rule governing the construction of words in production (and also likely in mental lexicon). In other words, speakers generate the morphologically complex words by merging morphemes rather than retrieving them as chunks.

It is useful to differentiate between three separate phases of language production:

1. conceptualization: "determining what to say";
2. formulation: "translating the intention to say something into linguistic form";
3. execution: "the detailed articulatory planning and articulation itself".

Psycholinguistic research has largely concerned itself with the study of formulation because the conceptualization phase remains largely elusive and mysterious.

=== Cognition and linguistic relativity ===
Linguistic relativity, often associated with the Sapir-Whorf hypothesis, posits that the structure of a language influences cognitive processes and world perception. While early formulations of this idea were largely speculative, modern psycholinguistic research has reframed it as a testable hypothesis within the broader study of language and thought.

Contemporary approaches to linguistic relativity are often discussed into following perspectives:

1. Weak linguistic relativity – Language biases cognitive tendencies but does not determine thought. This perspective aligns with experimental findings showing that linguistic structures influence perception, memory, and categorization probabilistically rather than absolutely.
2. Language as a cognitive tool – Language serves as a scaffolding mechanism for cognitive processes, actively shaping mental representations in domains such as space, time, and color perception.

A key refinement of linguistic relativity is Slobin's (1996) "Thinking for Speaking" hypothesis, which argues that language influences cognition most strongly when individuals prepare to communicate. Unlike traditional views of linguistic relativity, which suggest that language passively shapes thought, "Thinking for Speaking" proposes that speakers actively engage with linguistic categories and structures while constructing utterances.

From a psycholinguistic standpoint, research on linguistic relativity intersects with conceptual representations, perceptual learning, and cognitive flexibility. Experimental studies have tested these ideas by examining how speakers of different languages categorize the world differently. For instance, cross-linguistic comparisons in spatial cognition reveal that languages with absolute spatial frames (e.g., Guugu Yimithirr) encourage speakers to encode space differently than languages with relative spatial frames (e.g., English).

In the domain of bilingual cognition, psycholinguistic research suggests that bilinguals may experience cognitive restructuring, where language context modulates perception and categorization. Recent studies indicate that bilinguals can flexibly switch between different conceptual systems, depending on the language they are using, particularly in domains such as motion perception, event construal, and time perception.

Overall, linguistic relativity in psycholinguistics is no longer seen as a rigid determinism of thought by language, but rather as a gradual, experience-based modulation of cognition by linguistic structures. This perspective has led to a shift from a purely linguistic hypothesis to an integrative cognitive science framework incorporating evidence from experimental psychology, neuroscience, and computational modeling.

== Methodologies ==
=== Behavioral tasks ===
Many of the experiments conducted in psycholinguistics, especially early on, are behavioral in nature. In these types of studies, subjects are presented with linguistic stimuli and asked to respond. For example, they may be asked to make a judgment about a word (lexical decision), reproduce the stimulus, or say a visually presented word aloud. Reaction times to respond to the stimuli (usually on the order of milliseconds) and proportion of correct responses are the most often employed measures of performance in behavioral tasks. Such experiments often take advantage of priming effects, whereby a "priming" word or phrase appearing in the experiment can speed up the lexical decision for a related "target" word later.

As an example of how behavioral methods can be used in psycholinguistics research, Fischler (1977) investigated word encoding, using a lexical-decision task. He asked participants to make decisions about whether two strings of letters were English words. Sometimes the strings would be actual English words requiring a "yes" response, and other times they would be non-words requiring a "no" response. A subset of the licit words were related semantically (e.g., cat–dog) while others were unrelated (e.g., bread–stem). Fischler found that related word pairs were responded to faster, compared to unrelated word pairs, which suggests that semantic relatedness can facilitate word encoding.

=== Eye-movements ===
Recently, eye tracking has been used to study online language processing. Beginning with Rayner (1978), the importance of understanding eye-movements during reading was established. Later, Tanenhaus et al. (1995) used a visual-world paradigm to study the cognitive processes related to spoken language. Assuming that eye movements are closely linked to the current focus of attention, language processing can be studied by monitoring eye movements while a subject is listening to spoken language.

=== Language production errors ===
A number of corpora store naturally produced speech errors. Some of these collections, such as the Fromkin Speech Error Database hosted by the Max Planck Institute for Psycholinguistics, include multiple languages and are publicly available. Such corpora allow the analysis of many instances of a type. For example, research on hundreds of word substitutions can compare semantically- and phonologically-based errors to reveal different networks in the human lexicon. Another example from comparisons of many word substitutions reveals grammatical constraints; that is, nouns usually substitute for nouns and verbs for verbs.

But there are methodological challenges in collecting naturally produced speech errors. For example, some errors are easier to perceive than others. And, many errors can be interpreted in different ways. So research on language production also uses experimental methods to induce speech errors. For example, speakers can be asked to silently read several word pairs in a row like dog bone, dust ball, doll bed, dead bug, and barn door. Asked to say only the last pair aloud, they will often produce a sound exchange like "darn bore," which has a word starting with [d] first and a word starting with [b] second. Pairs like darn bore (from barn door) and gad boof (from bad goof) differ in that the first pair has real words and the second pair has nonsense words. Real-word pairs occurred more often in this experimental research. This result pointed to the unconscious monitoring and editing of speech that speakers do before they talk.

=== Neuroimaging ===
Until the recent advent of non-invasive medical techniques, brain surgery was the preferred way for language researchers to discover how language affects the brain. For example, severing the corpus callosum (the bundle of nerves that connects the two hemispheres of the brain) was at one time a treatment for some forms of epilepsy. Researchers could then study the ways in which the comprehension and production of language were affected by such drastic surgery. When an illness made brain surgery necessary, language researchers had an opportunity to pursue their research.

Newer, non-invasive techniques now include brain imaging by positron emission tomography (PET); functional magnetic resonance imaging (fMRI); event-related potentials (ERPs) in electroencephalography (EEG) and magnetoencephalography (MEG); and transcranial magnetic stimulation (TMS). Brain imaging techniques vary in their spatial and temporal resolutions (fMRI has a resolution of a few thousand neurons per pixel, and ERP has millisecond accuracy). Each methodology has advantages and disadvantages for the study of psycholinguistics.

=== Computational modeling ===
Computational modelling, such as the DRC model of reading and word recognition proposed by Max Coltheart and colleagues, is another methodology, which refers to the practice of setting up cognitive models in the form of executable computer programs. Such programs are useful because they require theorists to be explicit in their hypotheses and because they can be used to generate accurate predictions for theoretical models that are so complex that discursive analysis is unreliable. Other examples of computational modelling are McClelland and Elman's TRACE model of speech perception and Franklin Chang's Dual-Path model of sentence production.

=== Psychophysical approach ===
The psychophysical approach in psycholinguistics applies quantitative measurement techniques to investigate how linguistic structures influence perception and cognitive processes. Unlike traditional behavioral experiments that rely on categorical judgments or reaction times, psychophysical methods allow for precise, continuous measurement of perceptual and cognitive changes induced by language.

A key advantage of psychophysical methods is their ability to capture fine-grained perceptual effects of language. For instance, studies on color perception have used just-noticeable difference (JND) thresholds to show that speakers of languages with finer color distinctions (e.g., Russian for light vs. dark blue) exhibit heightened perceptual sensitivity at linguistic category boundaries.

Recent psychophysical research has also been applied to time perception, investigating how bilinguals process temporal information differently based on their linguistic background. Using psychophysical duration estimation tasks, researchers have demonstrated that bilinguals may exhibit different time perception patterns depending on which language they are using at the moment.

These methods provide insights into how linguistic categories shape cognitive processing at a perceptual level, distinguishing between effects that arise from language structure itself and those that emerge from general cognitive mechanisms. As psycholinguistics continues to integrate computational and neuroscientific approaches, psychophysical techniques offer a bridge between language processing and sensory cognition, refining our understanding of how language interacts with perception.

== Areas for further research ==
Psycholinguistics is concerned with the nature of the processes that the brain undergoes in order to comprehend and produce language. For example, the cohort model seeks to describe how words are retrieved from the mental lexicon when an individual hears or sees linguistic input. Using new non-invasive imaging techniques, recent research seeks to shed light on the areas of the brain involved in language processing.

Another unanswered question in psycholinguistics is whether the human ability to use syntax originates from innate mental structures or social interaction, and whether or not some animals can be taught the syntax of human language.

Two other major subfields of psycholinguistics investigate first language acquisition, the process by which infants acquire language, and second language acquisition. It is much more difficult for adults to acquire second languages than it is for infants to learn their first language (infants are able to learn more than one native language easily). Thus, sensitive periods may exist during which language can be learned readily. A great deal of research in psycholinguistics focuses on how this ability develops and diminishes over time. It also seems to be the case that the more languages one knows, the easier it is to learn more.

The field of aphasiology deals with language deficits that arise because of brain damage. Studies in aphasiology can offer both advances in therapy for individuals suffering from aphasia and further insight into how the brain processes language.

== See also ==
- Animal language
- Communication
- Determiner phrase
- Educational psychology
- Interpersonal communication
- Linguistic relativity
- Psychological nativism
- Reconstructive memory
