= Robert J. Glushko =

American academic (1953-)

- Known for: Document engineering, information architecture, business process modeling, XML vocabulary development
- Spouse: Pamela Samuelson

Academic background
- Education: University of California, San Diego
- Doctoral advisor: David Rumelhart

Robert J. Glushko is an adjunct professor at the University of California Berkeley School of Information. He has written a number of books including Document Engineering (2005) and The Discipline of Organizing (2013).

In 1997, he co-founded Veo Systems and helped pioneer the use of XML for electronic business. Veo's innovations included the Common Business Library (CBL), the first native XML vocabulary for business-to-business transactions, the primary starting point for what is now the Universal Business Language (UBL), and the Schema for Object-Oriented XML (SOX), the first object-oriented XML schema language. From 1999 to 2002 he headed Commerce One's XML architecture and technical standards activities, after Commerce One acquired Veo in 1998.

He is the husband of Pamela Samuelson. In 2001, they founded the David E. Rumelhart Prize for Contributions to the Theoretical Foundations of Human Cognition. Rumelhart was Glushko's thesis advisor at the University of California, San Diego, where he received his PhD in 1979. Glushko and Samuelson have also helped create several law school clinics working on public interest technology issues. These include:

- Glushko-Samuelson Intellectual Property Law Clinic of the Washington College of Law at American University
- Samuelson Law, Technology & Public Policy Clinic at University of California, Berkeley
- Samuelson-Glushko Intellectual Property and Information Law Clinic at Fordham University
- Samuelson-Glushko Technology Law & Policy Clinic at University of Colorado, Boulder
- Samuelson-Glushko Canadian Internet Policy & Public Interest Clinic, at the University of Ottawa.

== Awards ==
In 2008, Glushko was recognized as an honorary member of the Cognitive Science Society "for outstanding, sustained contributions to the general advancement of cognitive science, and in particular, to the Cognitive Science Society." He has also been named one of 50 UCSD Alumni Leaders by the UCSD Alumni Association.
