= Ken Forbus =

Computer scientist

Academic background
- Education: Massachusetts Institute of Technology (BS, MS, PhD)
- Doctoral advisor: Gerald Jay Sussman

Academic work
- Discipline: Computer science
- Sub-discipline: Artificial intelligence
- Institutions: UIUC; Northwestern University
- Doctoral students: Boi Faltings, Morteza Dehghani

Kenneth D. Forbus is an American computer scientist and the Walter P. Murphy Professor of Computer Science and Professor of Education at Northwestern University.

== Education ==
Forbus earned a Bachelor of Science in computer science, Master of Science in computer science, and PhD in artificial intelligence from the Massachusetts Institute of Technology.

== Career ==
Forbus is notable for his work in qualitative process theory, automated sketch understanding, and automated analogical reasoning. He also co-developed the structure mapping engine based on the structure-mapping theory with Brian Falkenhainer and Dedre Gentner . He is a fellow of the Association for the Advancement of Artificial Intelligence (AAAI) and the Cognitive Science Society.
