= Authors Alliance =

US non-profit organization

- Founded: 2014
- Founders: over 200 founding members
- Founded at: Berkeley, California
- Type: 501(c)(3) non-profit organization
- Purpose: Promoting authorship for the public good by supporting authors who write to be read.
- Key people: Pam Samuelson, Thomas Leonard, Molly Van Houweling, Carla Hesse
- Website: www.authorsalliance.org

A 2018 guide to negotiating author rights

Authors Alliance is a non-profit organization based in Berkeley, California, that facilitates widespread access to works of authorship by assisting and representing authors who want to disseminate knowledge and products of the imagination broadly.

== Main issues ==
The Authors Alliance's main issues are Managing Authors' Rights, Authorship Law & Policy, Reaching Audiences, and Authorial Reputation & Integrity.

== Rights reversion ==
The Author's Alliance has released a how-to guide on authors' rights reversion, "Understanding Rights Reversion: When, Why & How to Regain Copyright and Make Your Book More Available", a guide that arms authors with the information and strategies they need to revive their books, authored by Nicole Cabrera, Jordyn Ostroff and Brianna Schofield.

== See also ==
- List of major Creative Commons licensed works
