= Wayne D. Gray =

Wayne D. Gray is a professor of cognitive science and director of the cognitive science doctoral program at Rensselaer Polytechnic Institute.

== Research ==
Gray seeks to understand how goal-directed cognition is shaped by the accommodation of basic cognitive, perceptual, and motor operations to the cost-benefit structure of the designed task environment. These basic elements of integrated behavior, interactive routines, occur over a time span of 1/3 to 3 seconds and are typically beneath the level of our conscious awareness and deliberate control. Hence, non-deliberate forces that dynamically react to our task environment without our conscious awareness shape a large part of our mental life.

There is a basic and applied component to this research agenda. The Cognitive Science side focuses on the control of interactive behavior, resource allocation, dynamic decision making, memory, attention, and motor movement. The Cognitive Engineering side can be characterized by the terms visual analytics, human-computer interaction (HCI), cognitive workload, and human error. The two types of research feed into each other and are supported by a core of common techniques and methods including computational cognitive modeling, cognitive task analysis, and detailed collection and analysis of behaviors that take less than one second to occur (e.g., keystrokes, mouse movements, and eye gaze).

== Brief biography ==
Gray earned his Ph.D. from U. C. Berkeley in 1979. His first position was with the U.S. Army Research Institute, where he worked on tactical team training (at the Monterey Field Unit) and later on the application of artificial intelligence (AI) technology to training for air-defense systems (HAWK) (at ARI-HQ Alexandria, VA). He spent a postdoctoral year with John R. Anderson's lab at Carnegie Mellon University before joining the AI Laboratory of NYNEX' Science & Technology Division. At NYNEX he applied cognitive task analysis and cognitive modeling to the design and evaluation of interfaces for large, commercial telecommunications systems. His academic career began at Fordham University and then moved to George Mason University. He joined the Cognitive Science Department at Rensselaer Polytechnic Institute in 2002.

He is an active member of his professional communities. Gray is the editor-in-chief for Topics in Cognitive Science, the newest journal of the Cognitive Science Society. He is a past associate editor for the Cognitive Science journal (2006–2008), the Cognitive Systems Research journal (2003–2008), the Human Factors journal (1998–2006), and the ACM Transactions on Computer-Human Interaction (1995–2003). He chaired the Fourth International Conference on Cognitive Modeling (ICCM-2001) and co-chaired the Cognitive Science Society Conference in 2002. He is the founding chair of HFES' Human-Performance Modeling Technical Group (HPM-TG). In 2001 he was elected to a 6-year term on the board of governors for the Cognitive Science Society, where he served as chair and member of the executive committee from 2003 to 2006.
