= James McClelland (psychologist) =

American psychologist

James Lloyd McClelland
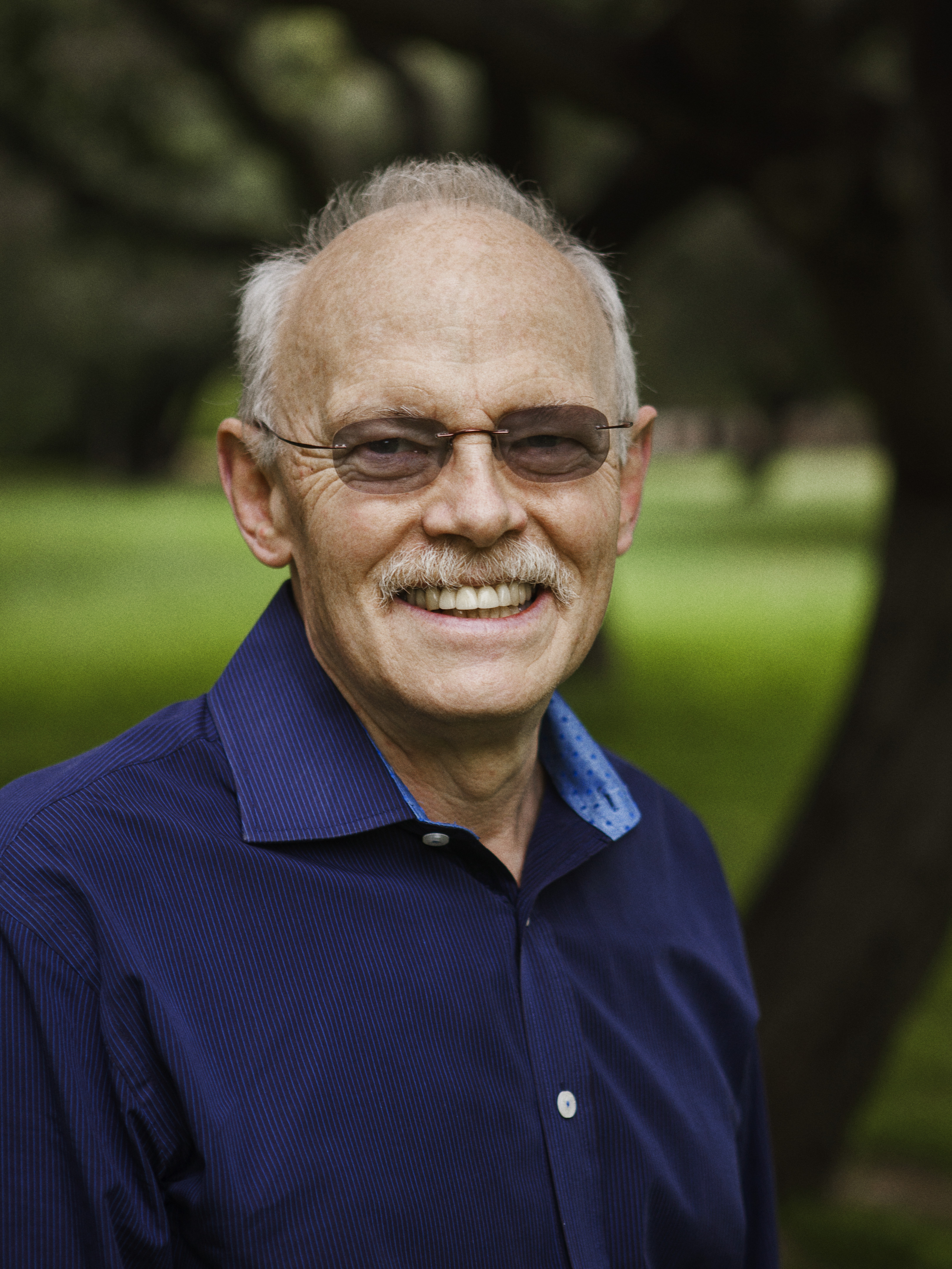
- Born: December 1, 1948 (age 77); Cambridge, Massachusetts
- Education: Columbia University; University of Pennsylvania
- Awards: Grawemeyer Award in Psychology (2002); Rumelhart Prize (2010)
- Scientific career
- Fields: Psychology
- Website: stanford.edu/~jlmcc/

James Lloyd "Jay" McClelland, FBA (born December 1, 1948) is the Lucie Stern Professor at Stanford University, where he was formerly the chair of the Psychology Department. He is best known for his work on statistical learning and Parallel Distributed Processing, applying connectionist models (or neural networks) to explain cognitive phenomena such as spoken word recognition and visual word recognition. McClelland is to a large extent responsible for the large increase in scientific interest in connectionism in the 1980s.

== Early life and education ==
McClelland was born on December 1, 1948, to Walter Moore and Frances (Shaffer) McClelland. He received a B.A. in Psychology from Columbia University in 1970, and a Ph.D. in Cognitive Psychology from the University of Pennsylvania in 1975. He married Heidi Marsha Feldman on May 6, 1978, and has two daughters.

== Career ==
In 1986, McClelland published Parallel Distributed Processing: Explorations in the Microstructure of Cognition with David Rumelhart, which some still regard as a bible for cognitive scientists. Geoffrey Hinton was a member of the PDP group. McClelland present work focuses on learning, memory processes, and psycholinguistics, still within the framework of connectionist models. He is a former chair of the Rumelhart Prize committee, having collaborated with Rumelhart for many years, and himself received the award in 2010 at the Cognitive Science Society Annual Conference in Portland, Oregon.

McClelland and Rumelhart are known for their debate with Steven Pinker and Alan Prince regarding the necessity of a language-specific learning module.

In fall 2006, McClelland moved to Stanford University from Carnegie Mellon University, where he was a professor of psychology and Cognitive Neuroscience. He also holds a part-time appointment as Consulting Professor at the Neuroscience and Aphasia Research Unit (NARU) within the School of Psychological Sciences, University of Manchester.

== Awards ==
- Mind & Brain Prize
- University of Louisville Grawemeyer Award in psychology, 2002
- William W. Cumming prize from Columbia University, 1970
- Research Scientist Career Development Award from the National Institute of Mental Health, 1981—86, 1987—97
- Fellow, National Science Foundation, 1970—73
- Rumelhart Prize, 2010
- C.L. de Carvalho-Heineken Prize, 2014

In July 2017, McClelland was elected a Corresponding Fellow of the British Academy (FBA), the United Kingdom's national academy for the humanities and social sciences.

== See also ==
- Artificial neural networks
- Cognitive science
- Connectionism
- Emergence
- TRACE model of speech perception
