= Cognitive Science (journal) =

Academic journal

- Discipline: Cognitive Science
- Language: English
- Edited by: Rick Dale

Publication details
- History: 1977–present
- Publisher: John Wiley & Sons on behalf of the Cognitive Science Society (United States)
- Frequency: 8/year
- Impact factor: 2.561 (2020)

Standard abbreviations
- ISO 4: Cogn. Sci.

Indexing
- ISSN: 0364-0213 (print); 1551-6709 (web)

Links
- Journal homepage

Cognitive Science is a multidisciplinary peer-reviewed academic journal published by John Wiley & Sons on behalf of the Cognitive Science Society. It was established in 1977 and covers all aspects of cognitive science.
