= Structure-mapping theory =

Theory of analogical reasoning

Structure-mapping theory is a theory of analogical reasoning, developed by Dedre Gentner, and for which she was awarded the 2016 David E. Rumelhart Prize for Contributions to the Theoretical Foundations of Human Cognition.

== Distinguishing analogy from other comparisons ==
Structure-mapping theory aims to improve upon previous theories of analogy, by distinguishing analogy from literal similarity. Previous theories, like Amos Tversky's contrast theory, assumed that an analogy is stronger, the more attributes the base and target have in common. Instead, structure-mapping theory recognizes that there can be differences between base and target domains which make no difference to the strength of the analogy. For example, we can see a battery as being like a reservoir despite them being different in shape, size, color and substance.

Structure-mapping theory responds by arguing that it is not object attributes which are mapped in an analogy. Instead the theory contends that an analogy alerts the hearer to a similarity in the relationships between objects in a domain. The distinction is made in terms of the arity of predicates - attributes are predicates with one argument, while relationships are predicates which take two or more arguments. So the proposition "x is large" asserts an attribute, while "x revolves around y" asserts a relationship. (Higher order predicates assert relationships between propositions)

=== Analogy vs literal similarity ===
By distinguishing attributes and relationships, we can distinguish literal similarities from analogies.

For example:

- The X12 star system in the Andromeda nebula is like the Solar System. - This is a literal similarity, because the intention is to map both relationships (e.g. between planets and the Sun) and attributes (e.g. the size and temperature of the Sun)
- The hydrogen atom is like the Solar System. (Rutherford, 1906) - This is an analogy, because only relational predicates, like relative motion and size, are to be mapped between domains.

=== Analogy vs general laws ===
Analogies can also be distinguished from general laws

- The hydrogen atom is a central force system. - This is a general law, in the sense that the base domain is an abstract domain of relationships, and actually includes no object attributes. Compare this to an analogy, where the base domain includes object attributes, which are excluded from the comparison.

=== Analogy vs. chronology ===
The distinction in the role of objects, attributes and relationships in the comparison also allows us to characterize a chronology as a comparison in which objects are compared (remain relatively constant), but relationships are not (i.e. are expected to differ).

=== Summary table ===
Gentner provides the following table to summarize the different types of domain comparison above:

	No. attributes mapped	No. relations mapped	Example
Literal similarity	Many	Many	The K5 planetary system is like the Solar System
Analogy	Few	Many	The atom is like the Solar System
Abstraction	Few*	Many	The atom is a central force system
Anomaly	Few	Few	Coffee is like the Solar System

== Systematicity principle ==
Part of our understanding about analogy is that it conveys a system of connected knowledge, not a mere assortment of independent facts. Such a system can be represented by an interconnected predicate structure in which higher-order predicates enforce connections among lower-order predicates. reflect this tacit preference for coherence in analogy, I propose the systematicity principle: A predicate that belongs to a mappable system of mutually interconnecting relationships is more likely to be imported into the target than is an isolated predicate.

(Gentner 1983, p162-163; emphasis added)

The systematicity principle helps to explain why, when comparing the atom to the Solar System, we do not try to map the relative temperature of the Sun and the Earth onto the nucleus-electron system. In short, the temperature has no strong connection to the other object relationships – such as distance, attractive force, relative mass, and relative motion (who revolves around whom) – which are mapped. What these other relationships share is a strong interdependence – reversing the mass relationship reverses the relative motion relationship, and changing the distance changes the attractive force, and so on.

== Structure mapping theory ==
Structure mapping, originally proposed by Dedre Gentner, is a theory in psychology that describes the psychological processes involved in reasoning through and learning from analogies. More specifically, this theory aims to describe how familiar knowledge, or knowledge about a base domain, can be used to inform an individual's understanding of a less familiar idea, or a target domain. According to this theory, individuals view their knowledge of domains as interconnected structures. In other words, a domain is viewed as consisting of objects, their properties, and the relationships that characterize the interactions between them. The process of analogy then involves:

1. Recognising similar structures between the base and target domains.
2. Finding deeper similarities by mapping other relationships of a base domain to the target domain.
3. Checking those findings against existing knowledge of the target domain.

In general, it has been found that people prefer analogies where the two systems correspond highly with each other (e.g. have similar relationships across the domains as opposed to just having similar objects across domains) when these people try to compare and contrast the systems. This is also known as the systematicity principle.

An example that has been used to illustrate structure mapping theory comes from Gentner and Gentner (1983) and uses the base domain of flowing water and the target domain of electricity. In a system of flowing water, the water is carried through pipes and the rate of water flow is determined by the pressure of the water towers or hills. This relationship corresponds to that of electricity flowing through a circuit. In a circuit, the electricity is carried through wires and the current, or rate of flow of electricity, is determined by the voltage, or electrical pressure. Given the similarity in structure, or structural alignment, between these domains, structure mapping theory would predict that relationships from one of these domains would be inferred in the other via analogy.

== Factors in reasoning ==
=== Language ===
Language can support analogical reasoning when relational labels are provided to increase clarity. For example, children struggle when they are asked to identify the relational structure between sets of boxes (e.g., Set 1: a small, medium, and large box. Set 2: a medium, large, and extra large box). Children will tend to map the medium box in Set 1 (where it is intermediate in size) to the medium box in Set 2 (where it is smallest in size), and the same happens with the large box in both sets. However, they fail to recognise that they should map the smallest box in Set 1 to the smallest box in Set 2, and so on. Children improve in their ability to identify this relationship when they have given relational labels, such as 'baby', 'mommy', and 'daddy'(or, in the box example, the words smallest, middle and largest).

While language may support analogical reasoning, it may not be necessary. Research has found that apes, who have limited language abilities, are also able to reason relationally, but this only occurs when base and target are highly aligned.

=== Clarity ===
How similar the objects being mapped to each other affects analogical reasoning. When objects in the base domains correspond to highly similar ones in target domains, there it is said to be very clear, which aids analogical processes. Being very clear helps a lot when using analogy to support problem-solving. For example, if students are asked to calculate how many golf balls each golfer will need at a tournament, they will then be able to apply this solution to future problems when the objects are highly similar (e.g. reasoning about how many tennis balls each player will need).

=== Processing capacities ===
In order to engage in analogical processes, an individual needs time to work through the processes of alignment, inference, and evaluation. If not given adequate time to engage in analogical reasoning, then one is more likely to fixate on lower level object correspondences between the two systems, as opposed identifying potentially more informative higher-order relationships that are analogous. Similar effects also occur if one's working memory is under a high cognitive load at the time (e.g., the person is trying to reason through an analogy while also keeping a word in the mind).

==== Structural alignment ====
Structural alignment is one process involved in the larger structure mapping theory. When people establish structural alignment between two domains that are being compared, they attempt to identify as many similarities between the systems as possible and maintain a one-to-one correspondence between elements (i.e., objects, properties, and relationships). In the flowing water and electricity analogy, a one-to-one correspondence is illustrated by water pipes mapping on to wires but not corresponding with any other elements in the circuit. Furthermore, structural alignment is also characterized by parallel connectivity. If there is a one-to-one correspondence between relationships across two systems (e.g., the rate of water flow through a pipe increases with pressure similarly to how the current in an electrical circuit increases with voltage), then the relevant objects and properties must also correspond (e.g. the rate of flow of water corresponds to electrical current and water pressure corresponds to voltage) and vice versa.

==== Inference ====
Analogical inference is the second process involved in the theory of structure mapping. After one finds out that the domains have a one-to-one correspondence (meaning each term in the first domain represents a similar term in the second) one can use this fact to make a conclusion about the second domain. During this process an individual draws inferences about the target domain by projecting information from the base domain to said target domain. The following example can be used to illustrate this process, where 1 represents information about a base domain, 2 represents correspondences between the base and target domain, and 3 represents an inference about the target domain:

1. In plumbing systems, narrow pipes lead to a decrease in rate of flow of water.
2. Narrow pipes correspond to resistors in an electrical circuit and water corresponds to electricity.
3. In electrical circuits, resistors lead to a decrease in the rate of flow of electricity.

==== Evaluation ====
Evaluation is a third process involved in the theory of structure mapping and happens after individual align structures and propose inferences about the target domain. During evaluation, they judge whether the analogy is relevant and plausible. This process has been described as solving the selection problem in analogy, or explaining how individuals choose which inferences to map from the base to target domain as analogies would be fruitless if all possible inferences were made. An analogy can be evaluated by two factors:

- Factual correctness. When evaluating an inference in terms of correctness, individuals compare the inference to their existing knowledge to determine whether the inference is true or false. In the case where they cannot determine the correctness, then they may consider the adaptability of the inference, or how easily the knowledge is modified when translating it from the base to target domain.
- Goal When evaluating an analogy, the inferences that provide insight have to be relevant to the situation at hand. For example, when individuals attempt to solve a problem, the inference should provide insight that moves them towards a workable solution or generate new, potentially helpful knowledge.

==== Capability development ====
Research suggests children are capable of using comparisons in order to learn abstract patterns, but this sometimes requires prompting from another. To provide support for this claim, researchers taught 3- and 4-year-olds a simple relationship by showing them a series of pictures. Each picture had 3 of the same animal and was labeled as a “toma” for the child. Some of these children were prompted to compare the different ‘tomas’ while others were not. After seeing the pictures and some having been prompted to compare, the children were tested on whether or not they had learned the abstract pattern (i.e., a ‘toma’ is a triad of matching animals). Children were shown two images and asked “Which is the ‘toma’?”. The first was a relational match and displayed a triad of matching animals they had not seen before, while the second image was an object match and displayed a triad of non-matching animals that the child had seen while learning about the relationship. The children who had been prompted to compare the tomas while learning were more likely to have learned the pattern and choose the relational match when being tested.

Children do not always need prompting to make comparisons in order to learn abstract relationships. Eventually, children undergo a relational shift, after which they begin seeing similar relations across different situations and instead of merely looking at matching objects. This is critical in their cognitive development as continuing to focus attention on specific objects would reduce children's ability to learn abstract patterns and reason analogically. Interestingly, some researchers have proposed that children's basic cognitive abilities (i.e., working memory and inhibitory control) do not drive this relational shift. Instead, it is driven by their relational knowledge, such as having labels for the objects that make the relationships more explicit (see previous section). However, there is not enough evidence to determine whether the relational shift is actually because basic cognitive abilities become better or relational knowledge becomes deeper.

Additionally, research has identified several factors that may increase the likelihood that a child may spontaneously engage in comparison and learn an abstract relationship, without the need for prompts. Comparison is more likely when the objects to be compared are close together in space and/or time are highly similar (although not so similar that they are matching objects, which interfere with identifying relationships), or share common labels.

== See also ==
- Structure mapping engine
