= Topics in Cognitive Science =

- Discipline: Cognitive science
- Language: English
- Edited by: Wayne D. Gray

Publication details
- History: 2009–present
- Publisher: Wiley-Blackwell & the Cognitive Science Society
- Frequency: Quarterly
- Impact factor: 2.284 (2017)

Standard abbreviations
- ISO 4: Top. Cogn. Sci.

Indexing
- ISSN: 1756-8757 (print); 1756-8765 (web)
- LCCN: 2010200303
- OCLC no.: 799991805

Links
- Journal homepage; Online access; Online archive

Topics in Cognitive Science (also stylized as topiCS) is a quarterly peer-reviewed scientific journal covering cognitive science. It was established in 2009, with its first issue published in January of that year. It is published by Wiley-Blackwell in a partnership with the Cognitive Science Society. The editor-in-chief is Andrea Bender (University of Bergen). According to the Journal Citation Reports, the journal has a 2017 impact factor of 2.284, ranking it 35th out of 85 journals in the category "Psychology, Experimental".
