= David Rumelhart =

American psychologist (1942–2011)

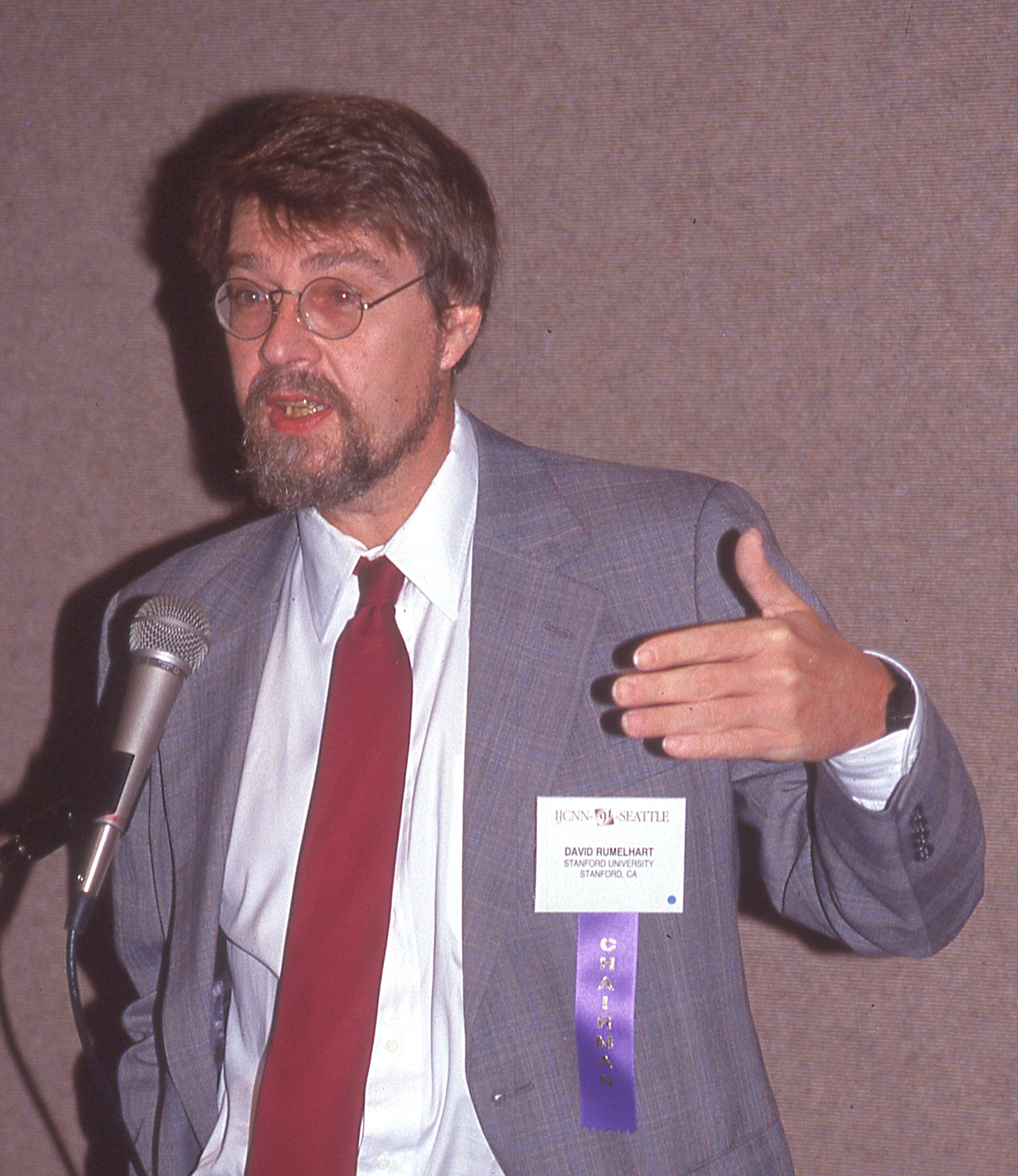
- Rumelhart in 1991
- Born: David Everett Rumelhart; June 12, 1942; Wessington Springs, South Dakota, US
- Died: March 13, 2011 (aged 68); Chelsea, Michigan, US
- Known for: Connectionism; Artificial neural network modeling Deep Learning; Applications of backpropagation
- Awards: MacArthur Fellowship (July 1987); National Academy of Sciences; Warren Medal of the Society of Experimental Psychologists; APA Distinguished Scientific Contribution Award; University of Louisville Grawemeyer Award (2002)
- Scientific career
- Fields: Psychology
- Workplaces: Stanford University; University of California, San Diego
- Thesis: The Effects of Interpresentation Intervals on Performance in a Continuous Paired-Associate Task (1967)
- Doctoral advisor: William Kaye Estes
- Doctoral students: Michael I. Jordan; Robert J. Glushko

David Everett Rumelhart (June 12, 1942 – March 13, 2011) was an American psychologist who made many contributions to the formal analysis of human cognition, working primarily within the frameworks of mathematical psychology, symbolic artificial intelligence, and parallel distributed processing. He also admired formal linguistic approaches to cognition, and explored the possibility of formulating a formal grammar to capture the structure of stories.

== Early life and education ==
Rumelhart was born in Mitchell, South Dakota on June 12, 1942. His parents were Everett Leroy and Thelma Theora (Ballard) Rumelhart. He began his college education at the University of South Dakota, receiving a B.A. in psychology and mathematics in 1963. He studied mathematical psychology at Stanford University, receiving his Ph.D. in 1967.

== Career ==
From 1967 to 1987, he served on the faculty of the Department of Psychology at the University of California, San Diego. In 1987, he moved to Stanford University, serving as Professor there until 1998.

Rumelhart was elected to the National Academy of Sciences in 1991 and received many prizes, including a MacArthur Fellowship in July 1987, the Warren Medal of the Society of Experimental Psychologists, and the APA Distinguished Scientific Contribution Award. Together with James McClelland, he won the 2002 University of Louisville Grawemeyer Award in Psychology.

== Personal life ==
Rumelhart became disabled by Pick's disease, a progressive neurodegenerative disease, and at the end of his life lived with his brother in Ann Arbor, Michigan. He died in Chelsea, Michigan. He is survived by two sons.

== Work ==
Rumelhart was the first author of a highly cited paper from 1985 (co-authored by Geoffrey Hinton and Ronald J. Williams) that applied the back-propagation algorithm to multi-layer neural networks. This work showed through experiments that such networks can learn useful internal representations of data. The approach has been widely used for basic cognition researches (e.g., memory, visual recognition) and practical applications. The 1985 paper does not cite earlier publications of backpropagation, such as the 1974 dissertation of Paul Werbos, as they did not know the earlier publications.

Rumelhart developed backpropagation in spring of 1982 independently. In 1983, he showed it to Terry Sejnowski, who tried it and found it to train much faster than Boltzmann machines (developed in 1983). Geoffrey Hinton however did not accept backpropagation, preferring Boltzmann machines, only accepting backpropagation a year later.

In the same year, Rumelhart also published Parallel Distributed Processing: Explorations in the Microstructure of Cognition with James McClelland, which described their creation of computer simulations of perceptrons, giving to computer scientists their first testable models of neural processing, and which is now regarded as a central text in the field of cognitive science.

His 1986 work with McClelland ignited the "past tense debate" during the 1980s revival of neural networks. The connectionism side debated the symbolic side, represented by Jerry Fodor, Gary Marcus, Zenon Pylyshyn, Steven Pinker, etc. The debate concerned whether neural networks or symbolic programs were adequate models for how English speakers can turn a verb into its past tense.

Rumelhart's models of semantic cognition and specific knowledge in a diversity of learned domains using initially non-hierarchical neuron-like processing units continue to interest scientists in the fields of artificial intelligence, anthropology, information science, and decision science.

In his honor, in 2000 the Robert J. Glushko and Pamela Samuelson Foundation created the David E. Rumelhart Prize for Contributions to the Theoretical Foundations of Human Cognition. A Review of General Psychology survey, published in 2002, ranked Rumelhart as the 88th most cited psychologist of the 20th century, tied with John Garcia, James J. Gibson, Louis Leon Thurstone, Margaret Floy Washburn, and Robert S. Woodworth.
