= Document engineering =

Document engineering is a computer science discipline. It focuses on the tools, processes and systems that improve the ability to create, manage, and maintain documents digitally.

In the context of document engineering, document may refer to any kind of document, but most often refers to documents somehow encoded in digital forms, and to ordered pieces of information extracted or derived from documents, typically to be used by computer applications or web services rather than directly by people. The structure of information both within and as extracted from documents, has particular relevance in the areas of XML and SQL schema design.

From 2003 to 2007, the University of California, Berkeley operated a research center for document engineering, which has been subsumed by its program in Information and Service Design.

The conventional discipline that most resembles document engineering is probably business informatics. However, document engineering emphasizes the need for conceptual modeling of documents and processes at an implementable granularity, and so involves linguistics, ontology, database theory, and a wide range of other disciplines.

The ACM Symposium on Document Engineering is a yearly conference of computer scientists interested in document engineering and related domains of text or document processing, and has been held since 2001.
