= Developmental linguistics =

Developmental linguistics is the study of the development of linguistic ability in an individual, particularly the acquisition of language in childhood. It involves research into the different stages in language acquisition, language retention, and language loss in both first and second languages, in addition to the area of bilingualism. Before infants can speak, the neural circuits in their brains are constantly being influenced by exposure to language. Developmental linguistics supports the idea that linguistic analysis is not timeless, as claimed in other approaches, but time-sensitive, and is not autonomous – social-communicative as well as bio-neurological aspects have to be taken into account in determining the causes of linguistic developments.

== Language acquisition ==
=== The concept of Nature vs. Nurture ===
Noam Chomsky (1995) proposes the theory of Universal grammar, supporting that a child's language abilities is a result of nature. The theory of Universal Grammar proposes that every child develops their language abilities through their innate and natural cognitive abilities in their mind, allowing them to learn languages. This inborn linguistic tool suggest that humans intrinsically have the ability to learn languages on their own.

On the other hand, the Behaviorist theory supports the theory that the ability for a human to learn language is a result of nurture. Central to this theory is the use of negative and positive reinforcement to achieve desired results. This is commonly observed in classrooms, where teachers utilize consequence or reward systems to motivate a student to succeed. Skinner (1957) believed that this form of nurture justified language development in children. Skinner (1957) claimed that children were not actually learning language per se, instead they were learning about rewards and consequences through the behaviorist theory when they were rewarded for their correct use of language, and punished for incorrect use of language.

=== Critical period ===
The Critical period is the first few years of life during which the brain is most sensitive to language learning and development, typically defined to be from age two to puberty. Researchers have found that this can be biologically explained through the maturity of the brain during childhood, leading to a gradual decrease of neuroplasticity in the language areas of the brain up until puberty.

This does not mean it is impossible to learn another language once a person is past the critical period. Though, vocabulary learning does not seem to be as sensitive to age, mastery of grammar and pronunciation of a language is not likely to be on par with the standard of a native speaker's if it is learnt past the critical period.

Generally, researchers agree that the critical period learning curve echoes the data for a wide variety of second-language acquisition studies. However, the temporally defined critical period does not apply in the same manner to every aspect of a language and it differs for the phonetics, lexical and syntactic levels of a language, though studies have yet to conclude the exact timing for each individual level.

Studies on monolingual children have shown that the time before an infant turns one year of age, is an important window for phonetic learning; between 18 months to 36 months of age is an important period for syntactic learning; and vocabulary acquisition grows exponentially at 18 months of age.

=== Social skills ===
Behaviourists believe that social environments play a vital role in language learning. Opportunities for social interactions among children as well as between children and adults are important for children to learn languages through exposure and practice.

=== Motor skill ===
Speech motor learning is an important part of the linguistic development of infants as they learn to use their mouths to articulate the various speech sounds in language. Speech production requires feedforward and feedback control pathways, in which the feedforward pathway directly controls the movements of the articulators (namely the lips, teeth, tongue and the other speech organs).

Typical tongue movements have been generated as a training set using major muscle combinations, and these muscle combinations are used as a basis for articulating a set of whole proto-vocalic tongue babbling movements in infants.

=== Phonetics ===
Word awareness involves the recognition of the respective syllables in each word, and breaking down these meaningful parts and recreating them into words. They also learn to read words in whole instead of their parts, and making sense of these words and their meanings in sentences.

=== Prosody ===
Tone refers to the use of pitch to mark lexical items whereas in intonation, variations in pitch patterns denote non-lexical differences like phrase boundaries and utterance-level pragmatic distinctions. Wormith et al. (1975) found that even from birth, infants are sensitive to fundamental frequencies in non-linguistic stimuli and are able to distinguish pure tones that differ only in F0.

Nazzi et al. (1998) have also demonstrated that infants even at an early age are sensitive to pitch differences when presented linguistic stimuli.

Perceptual reorganisation with regards to linguistic pitch occurs in children within 6 and 9 months of age. On the other hand, with regards to intonation, head-turn preference experiments have shown that by 4 to 5 months of age, infants are already sensitive to intonational units in speech.

=== Music ===
Across many academic fields there has been growing interest in the connections between music and language.

Some researchers have argued that the connections between music and language make it useful to combine the two in language teaching.

According to Jourdain (1997), language is primarily responsible for content whilst music is to evoke emotion. The impact of music on language is positive, affecting language accent, memory and grammar, as well as mood, enjoyment and motivation.

Joanne Loewy (1995) hinges on works of Charles Van Riper and proposes that instead of considering language in a cognitive context, it should instead be looked at in a musical context. Loewy (1995) terms this the ‘Musical Stages of Speech’.

Looking at the sounds created by infants during their developmental stages (crying and comfort utterances followed by babbling and eventually acquiring or comprehending words) prepare for telegraphic speech. Lowery (1995) asserts, “This music of speech is the earliest dimension of language understood by children”.

== Stages of vocal development ==
The five stages of vocal development are:

- Stage 1:
  - More crying and discomfort sounds than non-cry sounds
  - Non-cry sounds are vegetative (reflexive), neutral and mainly vocalic (vowel-like)
- Stage 2:
  - Marked decreased in crying after 12 weeks
  - Vowel-like sounds predominate, but consonant-like sounds are introduced.
  - Combining of consonantal (C) and vocalic (V) segments (‘coo’ or ‘goo’)
  - Glottal Cs heard
- Stage 3:
  - Increased number of C segments produces
  - More variation of V productions
  - Consistent production of CV syllables
  - Variation of intonational contours
- Stage 4:
  - Canonical, repetitive, or reduplicative babbling (i.e. CV or CVC-like structure)
  - Consistent variations of intonational contours
  - Early non-reduplicated CV syllables
  - Utterances produced with full stop
- Stage 5:
  - Variegated babbling (advanced from reduplicated babbling)
  - Variety of CV and CVC combinations with sentence-like intonation
  - Approximants of meaningful single words
  - Variety of Cs overlaid on sentence-like intonation

== Developmental issues ==
A typical child should acquire many of the critical components of a language by age three. Children who, when compared with peers their age, are not as competent in language in terms of language processing and speech production or areas related to communication, could possibly be displaying signs of global developmental delay. Having language-related developmental delays in childhood could cause problems in a child's development such as emotional, behavioural and literacy difficulties. Research has shown that children with developmental delays have a higher rate of having emotional and behavioural issues, and this is likely due to their frustration with having difficulties in communication. To minimise the rate of misdiagnosis, parents should bring their kids to see a Speech-Language Pathologist. In some cases, it might be a language disorder which requires treatment and therapy.

=== Speech-language pathologist ===
A Speech-Language Pathologist (SLP) is a qualified practitioner who is involved in professional practice in areas that affect communication and swallowing, specifically speech production, fluency, language, cognition, voice, resonance, feeding, swallowing, and hearing. Focus is placed on prevention and reduction of the possibility of developing a new disorder by recognising disorders or diseases during its early stages. The work of SLPs to improve communication and swallowing issues of an individual is a collaborative one which requires cooperative effort from the individual, the individual's family. Clinical visits to an SLP helps to lower the severity of a potential communicative disorder manifesting during childhood.

== Bilingual Language Learners ==
=== Benefits ===
==== Metalinguistic awareness ====
Early bilingualism is associated with advantages in metalinguistic awareness, which is the speaker's ability to distance himself from the content of speech in order to pay attention to the structural features of language and the language's properties as an object. In this aspect, bilingual children often display greater facility than their monolingual peers, in tasks such as judging the grammaticality of semantically anomalous sentences or in identifying and explaining language contrasts. Results have also shown that bilinguals benefit from the exposure of both languages and show cross-linguistic influences on metalinguistic skills in two typologically similar languages, which use different orthographies.

==== Cognitive advantages ====
Bilingual children also benefit from cognitive advantages in executive control, attention span and working memory. For instance, experiments using conflict monitoring and attentional control tasks like the Simon task or the Attentional Networks Task, results have concluded that early bilinguals outperform monolinguals in inhibiting prepotent responses, which suggests that the acquisition of two or more languages engages the same sort of switching and control mechanisms for languages as for general cognitive processes. While the extent of these advantages is under debate for adult learners and unbalanced bilinguals, bilingual children display cognitive benefits relative to monolingual children. Furthermore, bilinguals are found to be at an advantage in object classification and naming them, showing cognitive flexibility in such linguistic activities.

==== Linguistic effects ====
Unlike monolingual learners who can make recourse to the first language (L1) only, bilingual students can rely on the structural transfer of both their L1 and second language (L2) properties at the initial state of their third language (L3) acquisition. This means that bilingual learners can select from a larger pool of grammatical options from their L1 and L2 and thus exploit cross-linguistic correspondences to a greater extent than monolingual foreign learners.

=== Factors affecting bilingual benefits ===
1. Age of acquisition
2. Level of proficiency in all previously acquired languages
3. Usage of the minority language at home and in formal settings
4. Type of heritage language spoken at home

== See also ==
- Developmental psychology
- Language development
- Linguistic interference (language transfer)
- Linguistics
