= Cognitive Science Society =

Professional society

- Established: 1979; 47 years ago
- Type: Scientific Society
- Key people: Adele Goldberg, Chair (2022–2024)
- Website: cognitivesciencesociety.org

The Cognitive Science Society is a professional society for the interdisciplinary field of cognitive science. It brings together researchers from many fields who hold the common goal of understanding the nature of the human mind. The society promotes scientific interchange among researchers in disciplines comprising the field of cognitive science, including artificial intelligence, linguistics, anthropology, psychology, neuroscience, philosophy, and education. The Society is a member of the Federation of Associations in Behavioral & Brain Sciences.

== Meetings ==
The group sponsors the annual Conference of the Cognitive Science Society, a meeting which hosts the latest theories and data from cognitive science researchers, for which it also publishes proceedings. The first meeting of the conference was held in 1979 at the University of California, San Diego in La Jolla, California.

The society was incorporated in 1979 as a 501(c)(3) non-profit professional organization in Massachusetts. The organizing committee included Roger Schank, Allan Collins, Donald Norman, and a number of other scholars from psychology, linguistics, computer science, and philosophy. It currently has over 1,500 members, including a significant number from countries other than the United States.

== Awards ==
The Cognitive Science Society annually hosts the award symposium for the David E. Rumelhart Prize, which is given to individuals or teams who have made a significant contribution to the theoretical foundations of human cognition.

The Society also elects Fellow members based on sustained and significant impact on the cognitive science community.

== Journals ==
Journals published by the Cognitive Science Society:

- Cognitive Science, ISSN 0364-0213
- Topics in Cognitive Science, ISSN 1756-8757
