= Analogy (law) =

Method used to resolve issues on which there is no previous authority

Analogy in law is a method of resolving issues on which there is no previous authority by using argument from analogy. Analogy in general involves an inference drawn from one particular situation to another based on similarity, but legal analogy is distinguished by the need to use a legally relevant basis for drawing an analogy between two situations. It may be applied to various forms of legal authority, including statutory law and case law.

In the civil law and common law traditions, the basis of legal relevance that allows drawing a legally valid analogy is described by different terms depending on the source of law involved: ratio decidendi for precedent, ratio legis for statutory law, and ratio iuris for unwritten legal principles. The use of analogy in both traditions is broadly described by the traditional maxim Ubi eadem est ratio, ibi idem ius (where the reason is the same, the law is the same).

Although all legal systems use analogy in some fashion, different jurisdictions and legal traditions apply or limit analogy in many different ways. The civil law and common law traditions differ most prominently in the subject matter to which analogy is typically applied: in civil law courts, analogy is most typically employed to fill in gaps in a statute, while in common law courts it is most commonly used to apply and extend precedent. In addition, these legal systems have developed elaborate typologies of analogy, although these are often disputed.

The analogical extension of criminal penalties ("punishment by analogy") and tax liability is prohibited in many modern jurisdictions, under the various legal principles that safeguard legal certainty. Historically, however, punishment by analogy has been part of many legal systems, including those of imperial China, the early USSR, and the People's Republic of China prior to 1998. A few countries have retained legal provisions that at least nominally allow for punishment by analogy.

== Related concepts ==
Legal analogy is usually considered distinct from extensive interpretation, which stays within the words of existing law. However, some authorities argue that the distinction between the two is unclear or untenable, as both approaches extending the effect of a statute beyond its literal words based on the purpose or intent of the legislature. Some authorities do not distinguish between the two at all.

The use of inductive reasoning to derive a general rule from multiple legal norms or precedents and apply it to a new case is sometimes regarded as a form of analogy, for example [[#Analogia iuris|analogia iuris]], but is sometimes considered a distinct form of legal argument since it does not involve a direct analogy from an established case to a new one.

Legal analogy is also distinguished from related forms of legal argument that also turn on the underlying reason for a legal norm, such as argumentum e contrario and argumentum a fortiori.

The analogical interpretation of statutes may also be distinguished from interpretation by implication, although this distinction is not commonly drawn in the civil law tradition.

== Method ==
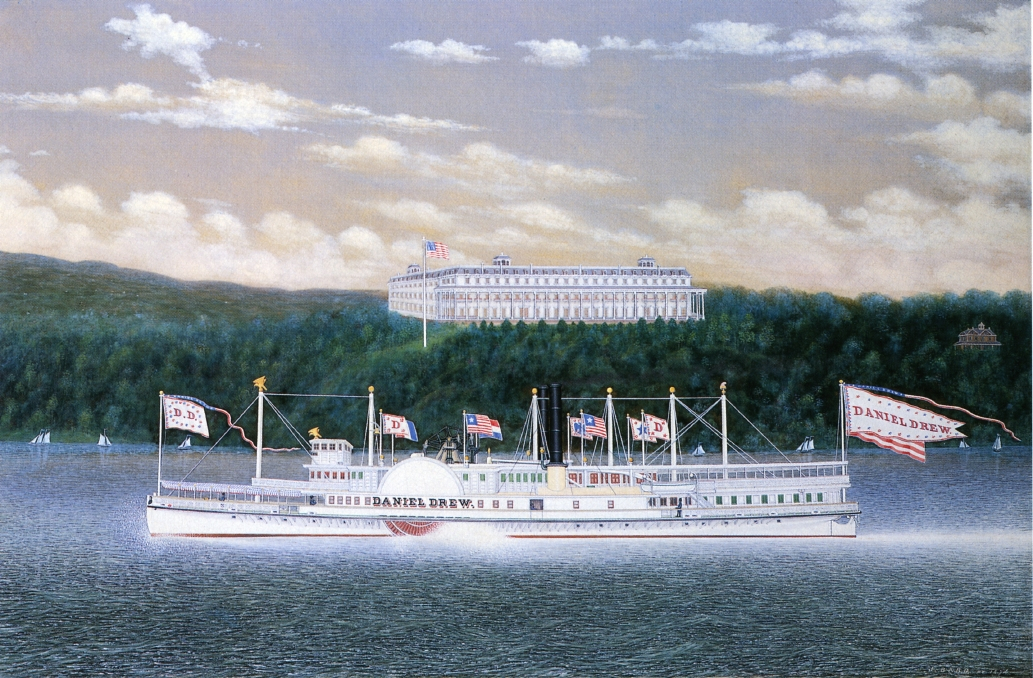
In the case of Adams v. New Jersey Steamboat Co., the New York Court of Appeals had to decide whether to analogize this steamboat to a train or an inn.

In broad terms, the use of analogy in law arises from the presumption that similar principles should apply to similar cases. In this broad sense, some legal scholars have argued that all legal reasoning is analogical.

More particularly, the general method of legal analogy has been described as having four steps:

1. An existing legal norm governs a known case.
2. No legal norm governs the current case (in other words, this case represents a legal gap or case of first impression).
3. These two cases are relevantly similar, and are not relevantly dissimilar.
4. Therefore, a new norm is created by applying the existing norm analogously in the current case.

The question of what makes the analogized case relevant generally turns on the reason for the existing norm (for example, the ratio legis of a statute or the ratio decidendi of a judicial precedent).

The detailed application of this method varies by the source of law. Within a legal system, the permitted use of analogy may vary greatly for example between statutory law and case law.

=== In case law ===
In case law, which is most prominently associated with the common law legal tradition, analogies are drawn from precedential cases. In the strongest case, a judge who decides a case at hand may find that the facts of the case are so similar to the facts of a prior case that the outcomes of these cases should be the same: stare decisis. Reasoning from the absence of analogy is also done, when a judge distinguishes a precedent and declines to apply it to the case at hand.

In one formulation, the method of analogy in applying precedent has the following steps:

1. An existing case has certain factual characteristics.
2. The current case also has these characteristics.
3. A particular legal characteristic applies to the existing case.
4. The factual similarities between the current case and the existing case are also relevant to the legal characteristic.
5. Therefore, unless there are countervailing considerations of equal or greater weight, the new case also shares the legal characteristic.
6. There are no countervailing considerations of equal or greater weight.
7. Therefore, the new case also shares the legal characteristic.

An often-cited example of analogical reasoning in case law is Adams v. New Jersey Steamboat Co., in which the New York Court of Appeals was called upon to decide whether a steamboat line was liable for money being stolen from a passenger's stateroom, even if neither the passenger nor the crew had been negligent. There was no settled rule of precedent for steamboat liability. If the same event had occurred at an inn, the innkeeper would have been liable. In deciding the case, judge Denis O'Brien wrote that a steamboat passenger "procures and pays for his room for the same reasons that a guest at an inn does" and that a "steamer carrying passengers upon the water, and furnishing them with rooms and entertainment, is, for all practical purposes, a floating inn". He therefore concluded that "the duties which the proprietors owe to the passengers in their charge ought to be the same" and that "no good reason is apparent" for departing from the strict liability that applied to innkeepers. Therefore, because the cases were analogous in relevant respects and there were no countervailing considerations, the steamboat company was also liable.

In a more recent example, in Popov v. Hayashi, a valuable baseball was caught by two different people, confronting the California Superior Court with a fact pattern not governed by established legal standards for possession. The court reasoned by analogy with a New Jersey case involving children tossing an abandoned sock that turned out to contain money in determining that possession required both physical control and intent, and that under the circumstances it was appropriate to order an equitable division among the two people who caught the baseball. The court's decision in Popov has been analogized to the civil law practice of analogia legis to fill in gaps in existing legal norms.

=== In statutory law ===
In statutory interpretation, analogy is used chiefly in civil law legal systems to extend a statute to cover new situations that are outside the actual language of the statute but within its underlying justification. This kind of statutory interpretation by analogy is formally recognized in the civil codes of most civil law jurisdictions, in both analogia legis and analogia iuris forms. In practice, however, such analogies come into play in only a small minority of cases. A 1978 survey of approximately 1,000 German civil cases found that only 1/20 of them involved statutory analogies.

In addition, a form of analogy also used by the courts in common law jurisdictions to interpret statutes is analogous interpretation: if there are two similar statutes and one has already been construed, the court may construe the second statute by analogy to the construction of the first. This has been referred to as "analogical extensive interpretation".

Some statutes expressly provide for their provisions to be applied analogously. This statutory mandate to analogize gives the resulting analogies greater legal weight. One form of statutorily-mandated analogy is mutatis mutandis application, often translated as "analogous application". For example, the Dutch euthanasia statute provides for the provisions regarding an informed decision by the patient to be applied mutatis mutandis where the patient is incapable of making such decisions.

A more unusual example of mandated analogy is found in the Dutch civil code of 1992, where certain provisions governing liability for animals and dangerous objects call on the judge to analogize the case to a counterfactual. For example, Article 6:179 provides that the possessor of an animal is liable for damage unless the possessor would not have been liable, even if the animal was under his control, under the limitations of liability in the preceding section.

==== In constitutional law ====
Even in jurisdictions that do not widely practice statutory analogy, analogical methods may be used for interpreting constitutional law. For example, in Canada, the Section 15 Charter right to be free of discrimination covers not only the specific grounds for discrimination listed in the Charter, but also "analogous" grounds such as sexual orientation and marital status. The analogous prohibition in Section 9 of the Constitution of South Africa has also been similarly extended to protect against forms of discrimination analogous to those listed in the constitution.

In United States constitutional law, rights implied by analogy are often referred to as being in the penumbra of the Bill of Rights. This terminology was used by Oliver Wendell Holmes Jr. to describe rights developed by analogy to the Fourth and Fifth Amendments of the US Constitution, and also later by William O. Douglas to describe rights implied by various constitutional amendments, which he regarded as protected by the Ninth Amendment.

In 2022, in NYSRPA v. Bruen, the United States Supreme Court adopted a doctrine that requires courts to use historical analogies to determine whether a statute violates the Second Amendment to the United States Constitution.

The theory of penumbral rights developed by analogy with those articulated in the constitution has also been adopted in other countries. For example, courts in Bangladesh and India have used penumbral theory to extend a constitutional guarantee of the right to life to a right to a healthy environment.

==== In treaty law ====
Teleological interpretation is commonly practiced by international tribunals. It is particularly associated with the jurisprudence of the European Court of Justice in interpreting the Treaties of the European Union. A teleological approach entails the frequent use of analogy to ensure that the purpose of a treaty's drafters is adequately served.

In addition, some treaties expressly call for their provisions to be interpreted analogously in certain situations. For example, the First Geneva Convention directly addresses the actions of belligerents, but in Article 6 also calls for neutral powers to apply its provisions by analogy.

== Classification ==
Various classifications of legal analogy have been proposed. One typology that has been influential in the civil law tradition classifies legal analogies as intra legem or extra legem based on the legal gaps that they fill:

- Extra legem (outside the law) refers to an analogy used to close a gap due to an issue not being clearly dealt with in existing law.
- Intra legem (within the law) refers to an analogy that closes a gap in which a law-controlled provision regulates the case at hand, but is unclear or ambiguous. In such circumstances, to decide the case at hand, one may try to find out what this provision means by relying on law-controlled provisions which address cases that are similar to the case at hand or other cases that are regulated by this unclear/ambiguous provision for help.

Other terms are also used:

- Contra legem (against the law) refers to an analogy used to avoid the unwanted application of a statute to a case. Such an analogy operates to create a gap rather than to fill one. For example, in 1961 the Supreme Court of Spain used analogy contra legem to reason that a statute that on its face applied to restrict the transfer of both bearer shares and nominative shares should not apply to bearer shares.

=== Analogia legis and analogia iuris ===
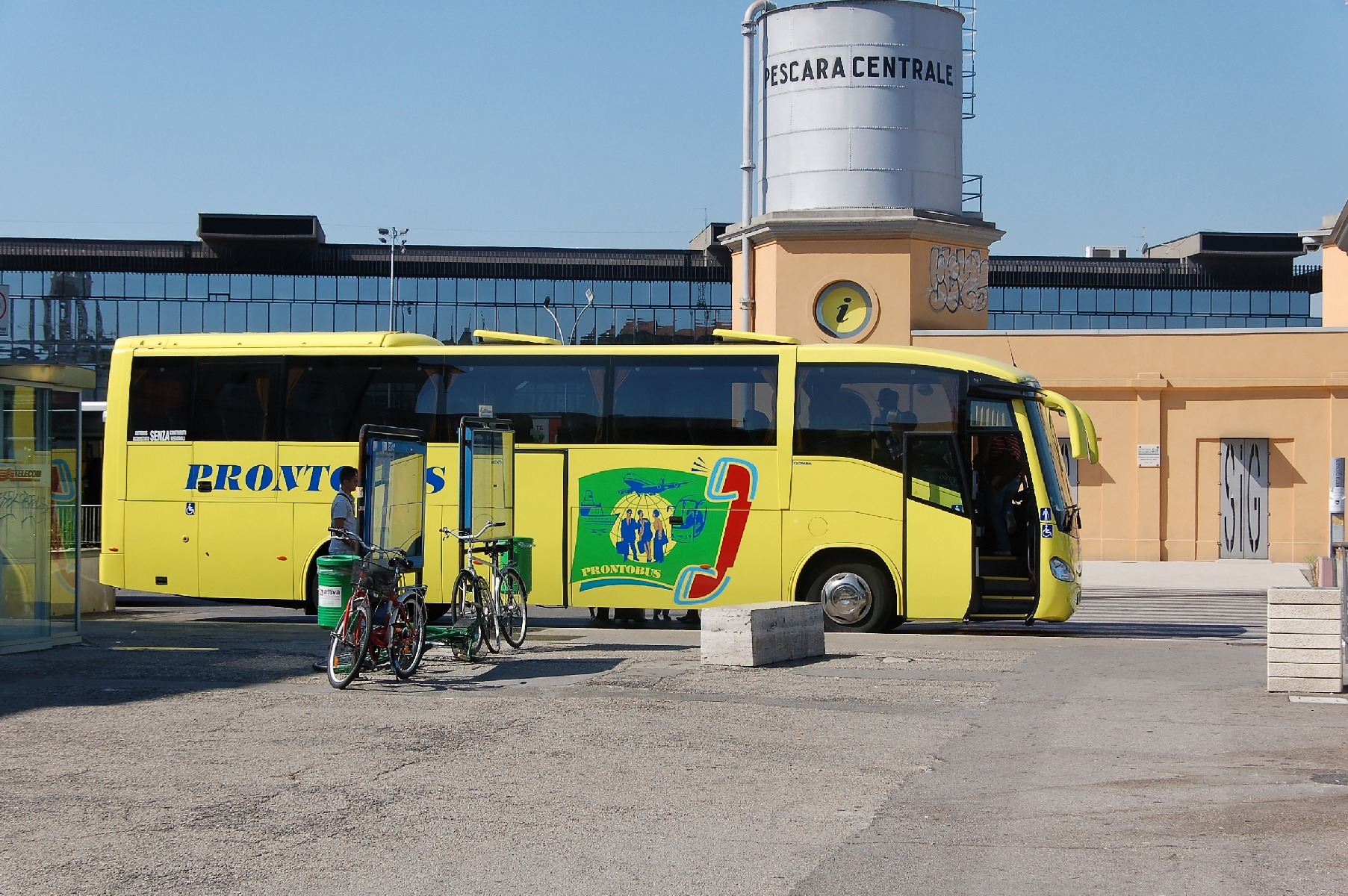
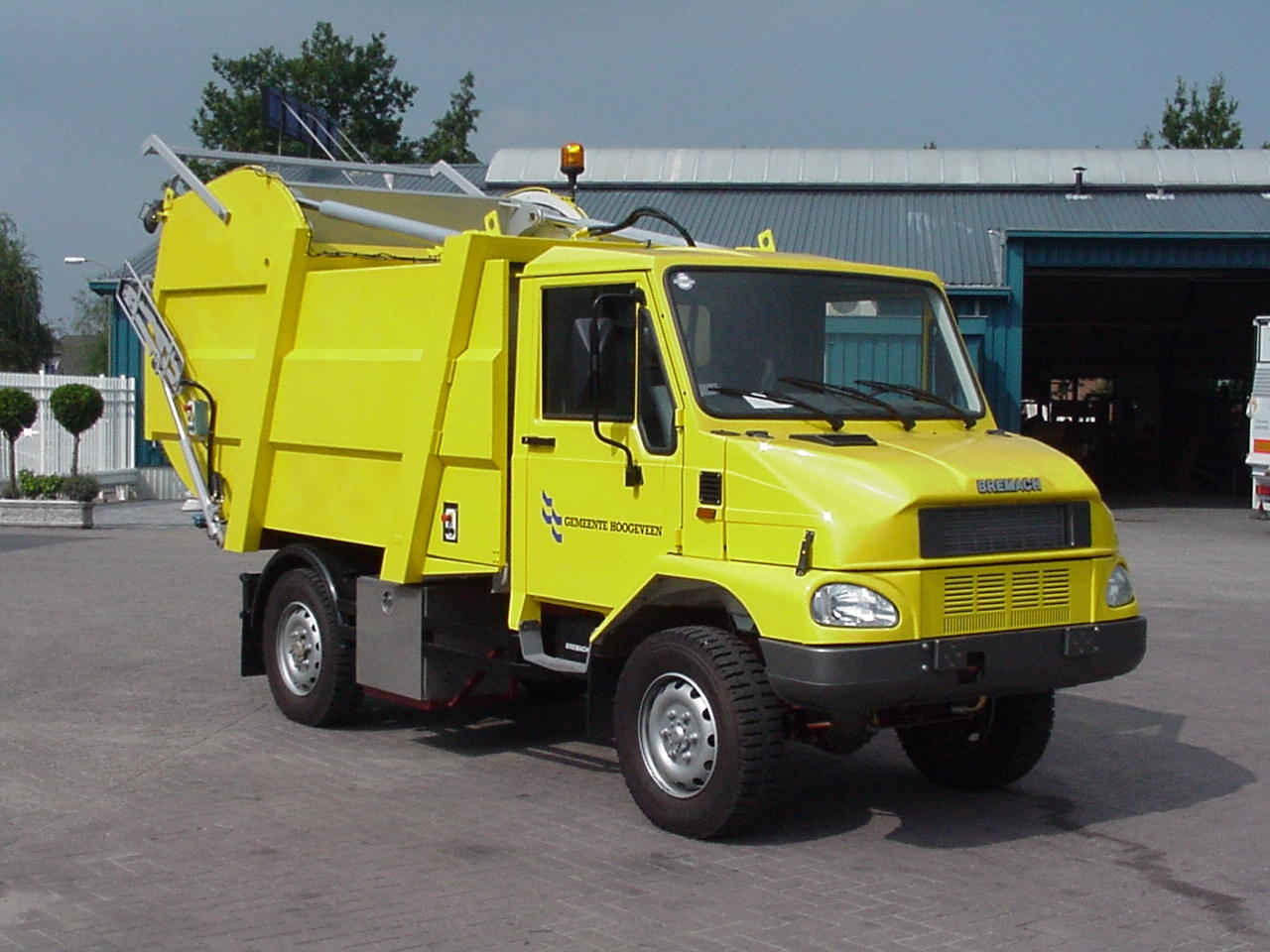
Analogia legis can analogize a garbage truck to a bus based on the underlying legislative purpose, as the Italian Constitutional Court did in 2010.

Analogia legis, also known as "statutory analogy" or "analogy from statute", is a method of statutory interpretation in which the legal principle applicable to a fact pattern not covered by a legal norm is determined by analogy to a norm that governs a comparable situation.

The analogy is typically governed by the ratio legis, or underlying purpose of the statute. For example, in a 2010 decision, the Italian Constitutional Court determined that a statute allowing drivers of public transport vehicles to carry only an authenticated photocopy of the vehicle registration, rather than the originals, also extended to waste haulers, even though they were not expressly covered by the statute, because the same legislative purpose applied in both cases.

When analogia legis is not possible then analogia iuris may apply, in which the analogy is derived not from a statute but from fundamental legal or constitutional principles. Analogia iuris has also been described as the court constructing a new, previously unarticulated general principle of law. However, although the distinction between analogia legis and analogia juris is traditional, some authorities have argued that there is no tenable distinction between them, as both involve the same interpretive techniques.

A prominent example of analogia iuris occurred in the Dutch case of Quint v. Te Poel, decided by the Dutch Supreme Court in 1959, in which homebuilders sought compensation from the owner of the property on which they had built homes, although the owner was not a party to the homebuilders' contract. The Dutch Civil Code of 1838, which was then in effect, contained clauses prohibiting specific examples of unjust enrichment but did not contain any general prohibition on unjust enrichment. The court generalized from these existing provisions to create a new cause of action for unjust enrichment, allowing the builders to recover from the property owner.

Analogia legis is formally recognized in the civil codes of many jurisdictions. The Portuguese Civil Code for example provides that "cases for which the law does not provide shall be governed by the norm applicable to similar cases". Some countries, such as Ukraine, formally recognize both analogia legis and analogia iuris by name in their civil codes. A number of European countries, including Italy and Slovenia, follow the example of the Austrian civil code in that they provide for both analogia legis and analogia juris, but describe them rather than naming them:

If a case cannot be decided based on either the words of a statute or the natural sense of the statute, consideration must be given to similar cases that have been decided in the statutes and the bases of other statutes related to it. If the case remains in doubt, the case must be decided according to natural principles of law, with regard to the carefully collected and maturely considered facts.

=== Rule-based and principle-based analogy ===
Ronald Dworkin's distinction between legal rules and legal principles has sometimes been adopted to distinguish rule-based analogies, which seek to fill in gaps in a system of rules, and principle-based analogies, which analogize specific cases based on deeper values of the legal system. Bartosz Brożek has argued that rule-based analogies, as well as "factual analogies" which purport to be based purely on factual similarity, are only justifiable if they rest on principles.

== Restrictions and criticisms ==
The principles of legal analogy vary among jurisdictions. Sometimes the use of analogy is forbidden: the most common such limitation is on the use of analogy to extend criminal liability.

Some authorities argue against the use of analogy in legal reasoning entirely, for example on the basis that it is essentially ad hoc or unscientific. In the American tradition, for example, Frederick Schauer argued that analogy in caselaw can only involve deduction from a rule that happens to apply to both cases. Richard Posner regards analogy as merely a mixture of induction, deduction, and rhetoric, which would be better replaced by straightforward considerations of correctness and stability. Lawrence A. Alexander criticized analogy for entrenching the errors made in past cases. In Alexander's phrasing, analogical reasoning in law amounts to asking the question "what would be morally correct in a world in which moral errors were not errors?" Less forcefully, some authorities argue that analogy is at best a heuristic tool, without any argumentative force of its own.

For those authorities that recognize a proper role for analogy in law, some common limitations include the following:

- In common law legal systems, the casus omissus doctrine is often invoked to prohibit using analogy to extend the scope of a statute beyond the written text.
- In tax law, in some jurisdictions, analogies may not be used to interpret tax laws in a way that would lead to an increase in taxation or would otherwise be harmful to the interests of taxpayers. In Polish law, this principle dates to the 14th century, and is expressed by the Latin maxim "nullum tributum sine lege" (no tax without law).
- In many jurisdictions, extending by analogy those provisions of administrative law that restrict human rights and the rights of the citizens (particularly the category of the so-called "individual rights" or "basic rights"). By the same token, analogy generally should not be used to increase a citizen's burdens and obligations.
- Some authorities prohibit using analogy to extend the scope of statutory exceptions to more general provisions. François Gény described this with the Latin phrase exceptio est strictissimae interpretationis (an exception must be very narrowly construed). It is also known under the phrase singularia non sunt extendenda (exceptional provisions should not be extended). The principle dates to a Roman prohibition on extending a "particular law" ius singulare by analogy. However, it is no longer widely accepted; for example, the German Federal Supreme Court applied this principle as recently as 1951 but has since largely rejected it.
- Some jurisdictions prohibit using an analogy to extend lists that are enumerated in a statute.
- Some jurisdictions prohibit using analogy to broaden provisions that the legislature intended to be exclusive to a particular subject (such a manner is especially implied when the wording of a given statutory provision involves such pointers as: "only", "exclusively", "solely", "always", "never"), or that have a plain precise meaning.

=== In criminal law ===
In most legal systems today, analogy cannot be used in the interpretation of criminal statutes, unless the result is favorable to the accused. Such a ban finds its footing in the maxim nullum crimen, nulla poena sine lege (no crime or punishment without law), which is understood in the way that there is no crime or punishment unless it is plainly provided for in a law-controlled provision or an already existing judicial precedent. Some jurisdictions such as Germany also extend this prohibition to lesser punishments such as contraventions, and to disciplinary proceedings against public servants, even if these are not considered criminal in nature.

In its modern, absolute form, this prohibition is of relatively recent origin. Early modern common law commentators such as Edmund Plowden encouraged the analogical construction of both civil and criminal statutes. In English law, the modern prohibition took hold in the 18th century and was adopted by commentators such as Blackstone and Matthew Bacon.

Among civil law jurisdictions, punishment by analogy was expressly provided for under several early criminal codes, including the Prussian code of 1721 and the Constitutio Criminalis Theresiana of 1769. This practice was criticized by Enlightenment theorists such as Montesquieu and Beccaria.

The first criminal code to bar the use of analogy was the Austrian penal code of 1787. Such bans quickly spread across Europe in the late 18th and 19th centuries, reaching Prussia in 1794 and Germany in 1871. However, punishment by analogy continued to be allowed under the Russian penal code of 1845, and also in Nazi German law following the decree of June 28, 1935.

== By legal tradition ==
Forms of legal analogy arose in antiquity in several traditions, including classical Greek, Indian, and Chinese law. The exact uses and doctrines surrounding legal analogy have developed differently in various different legal traditions.

=== Greek and Roman law ===
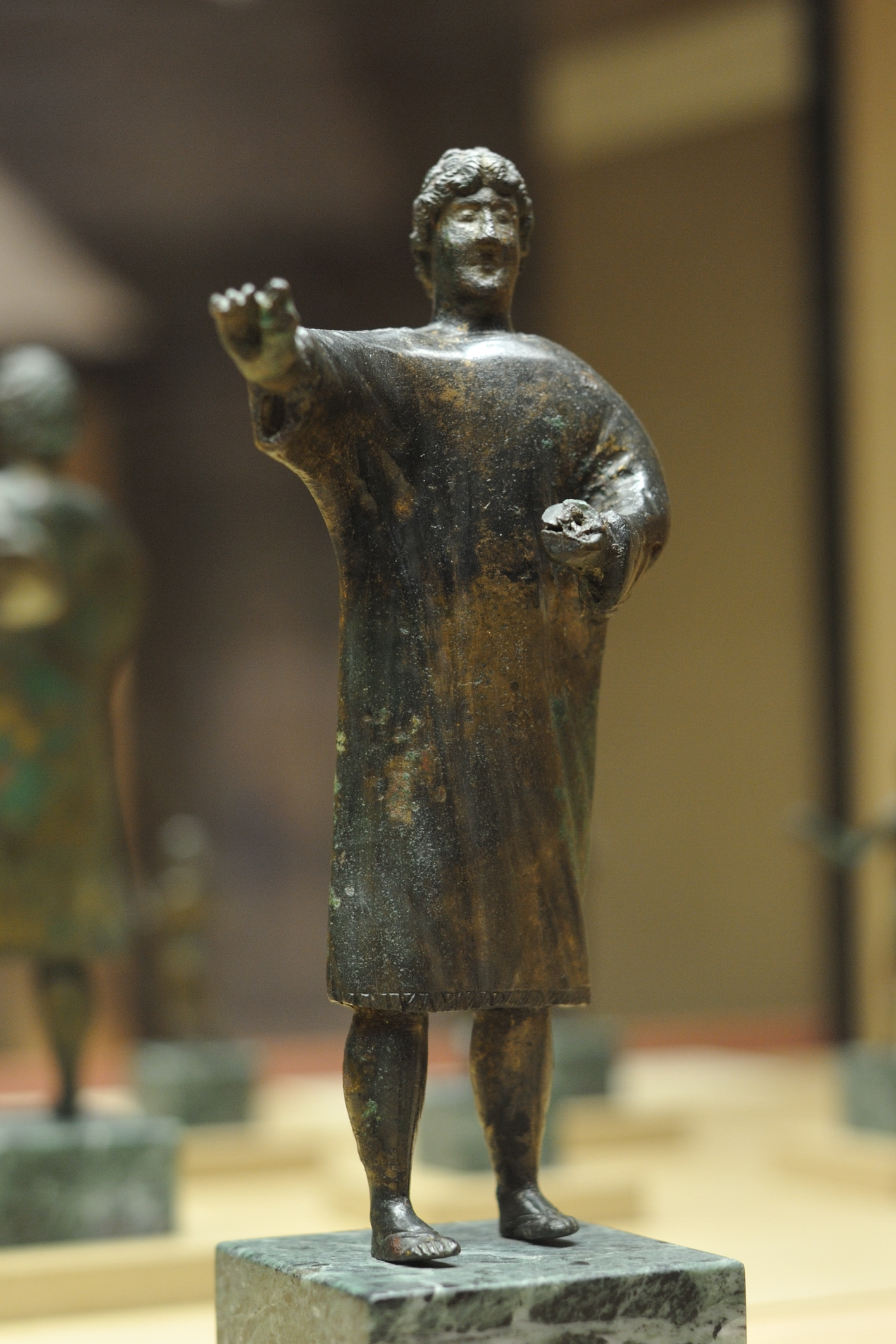
Ancient Roman sculpture of an orator

In the law courts of ancient Athens, where decisions were made by the jury of dikastai, arguments by analogy were commonly used. For example, the fourth-century BCE orator Isaeus argued against the validity of a will made by a minor by reference to a law prohibiting minors from making contracts.

In the Nicomachean Ethics, Aristotle advanced an "equitable" theory of statutory interpretation that became the basis of many Western approaches to analogical interpretation:

When therefore the law lays down a general rule, and thereafter a case arises which is an exception to the rule, it is then right, where the lawgiver's pronouncement because of its absoluteness is defective and erroneous, to rectify the defect by deciding as the lawgiver would himself decide if he were present on the occasion, and would have enacted if he had been cognizant of the case in question.

Aristotle's teaching has been adopted historically by authorities in both civil law and common law.

In Roman legal oratory, arguing for a statutory interpretation by analogy was one of several techniques for arguing against a literal interpretation. In that context it was called exemplo multarum legum, "by example of many laws". This technique was widely used by orators but was not recognized by jurists such as Salvius Julianus. Instead, the jurists largely restricted their use of analogy to drawing analogies among similar juristic precedents.

=== Early Irish law ===
In the Brehon law tradition of Ireland, which first entered the written record in early medieval times, analogy (cosmailius) was one of the sources of law on which a judge could base a decision. Analogy was often used to adapt traditional legal maxims to new technologies. For example, various precepts governing water mills were developed by analogy after that technology was introduced in the third century.

A Brehon law text that employed analogy particularly extensively was the Bechbretha, or "Bee-Judgments", tentatively dated to the 7th century. The author set forth legal principles governing beekeeping based on analogies to existing legal principles governing cattle and fruit trees. For example, the Bechbretha provides that if a beehive was established in a tree overhanging a neighbor's land, the swarms from that hive would become the neighbor's property in every fourth year.

A famous although possibly apocryphal example of analogy in Brehon law was king Diarmait mac Cerbaill's sixth-century ruling on a dispute between Columba and Finnian of Movilla over the copying of a religious text, which has been described as the world's first copyright case. According to a possibly apocryphal account first recorded in the 16th century, the king resolved the dispute by analogy to the legal maxim "to every cow her calf", declaring likewise "to every book its copy", so that Columba's copy of the book remained Finnian's property. This has been described as the oldest recorded copyright infringement case.

=== Civil law ===
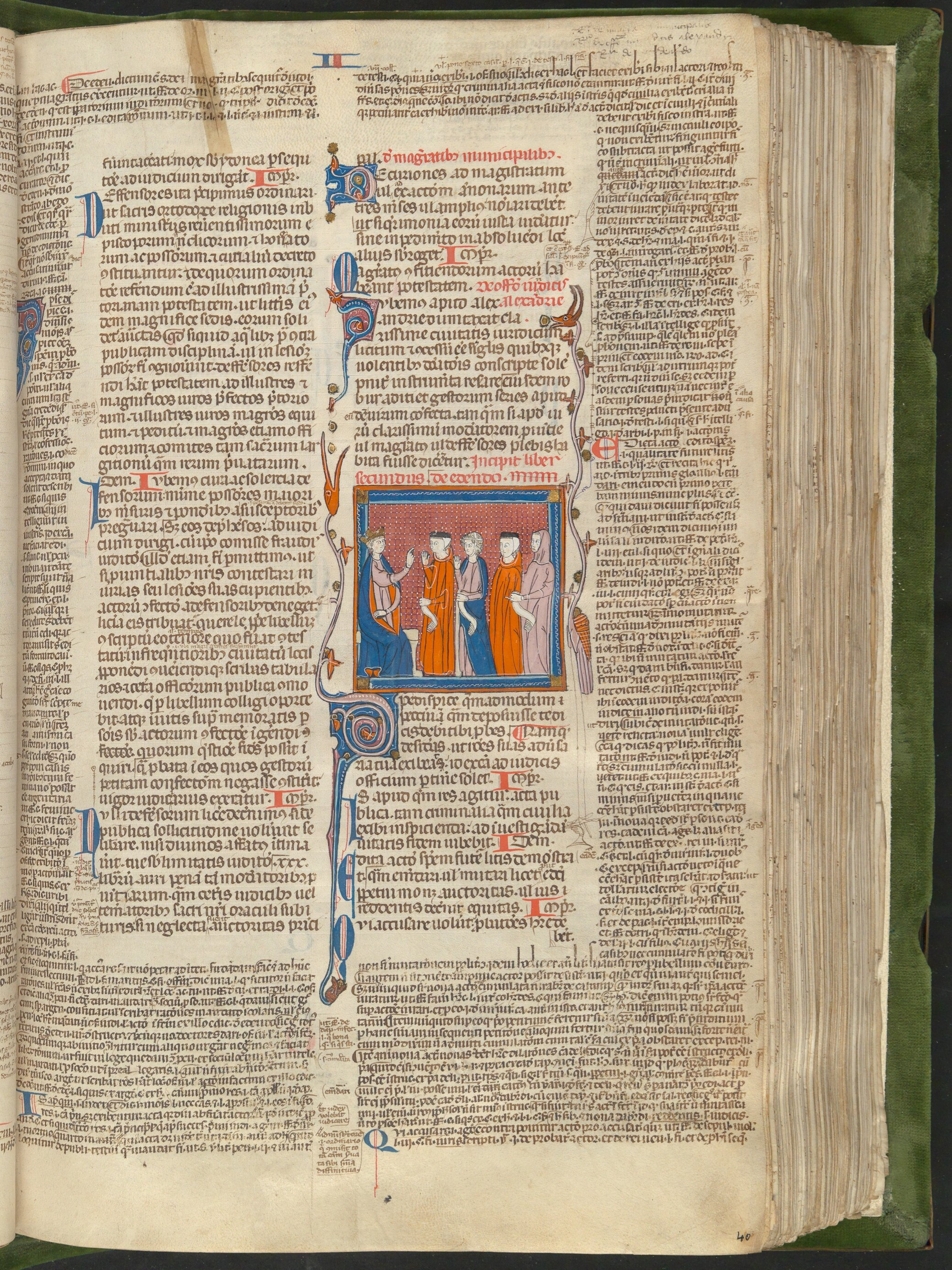
A medieval copy of the Codex of Justinian made by the jurist Accursius

In the civil law tradition, the systematic use of analogy dates to medieval times, when the glossators and subsequent commentators used it to fill in gaps in the topics covered by the Roman legal authorities such as the Codex of Justinian. The fourteenth-century jurist Lucas de Penna wrote that "where the reason is the same or greater, the law is drawn to a similar case even if not expressed". A long tradition supports the use of analogical reasoning, including both analogia legis and analogia iuris (analogy of statute and analogy of justice), to extend statutes to cover new situations or to articulate previously implicit legal principles.

Analogy in general is often described by one or another form of a medieval Latin maxim, Ubi eadem ratio, ibi idem ius (where the reason is the same, the law is the same). This maxim was formulated by the glossator Azo of Bologna in the thirteenth century. It was used to justify extending a limited prohibition on criminal appeals for a few heinous crimes to cover all crimes, on the theory that the same reason applied in all cases. It has subsequently become a commonplace of both civil and common law.

The modern systematic distinction between analogia legis and analogia iuris was first articulated in 1797 by the German jurist Carl Ludwig Wilhelm von Grolmann. Grolmann did not use the Latin terms, but referred to these two forms of analogy respectively as Rechtsanalogie and Gesetzesanalogie. A more thorough justification of the distinction between these two forms of analogy was subsequently articulated by Carl Georg von Wächter.

In modern civil law, the most typical use of analogy is to fill gaps in existing statutory law. A judge wishing to apply analogical techniques must first show that there is a gap in existing law (which the legislature did not intend to leave unfilled) and that there are no constitutional barriers to the use of analogy.

=== Common law ===
In common law systems, analogy has traditionally been considered a cornerstone of legal argument and judicial decisionmaking. The most typical use of analogy in common law is to extend a precedent from one case to a legally similar one. However, some modern authorities such as Richard Posner have challenged whether analogy is a valid method of judicial reasoning at all.

The use of analogy in statutory interpretation has a long and controversial history in the common law. In early English law, judicial extensions of statutory language were commonplace. After the mid-14th century, however, this came to be recognized as outside the judicial role. English courts continued, however, to extend statutes by analogy to the extent that cases involved the "same mischief" with which the statute was concerned. By the sixteenth century this practice was justified under the Aristotelian doctrine of "equity of the statute" (lequity de lestatut). In an influential sixteenth-century formulation, Edmund Plowden analogized the relationship of the statute and its equitable interpretation to the relationship between a seed and the fruit around it. Plowden described the use of analogy in statutory interpretation as the power of a court to extend the scope of a statute so that "when the words of a statute enact one thing, they enact all other things which are in the like degree."

The equity of the statute doctrine largely fell out of favor in the late 18th century, coming to be regarded as a breach of the separation of powers or of parliamentary sovereignty. Instead, using analogical reasoning to extend statutes to new situations came to be prohibited under the maxim that casus omissus pro omisso habendus est (an omitted case is to be taken as intentionally omitted). This principle is often referred to as the "casus omissus rule" or in contemporary United States textualist scholarship the "omitted-case canon". Analogical interpretations continued to be made, for example in the early United Status admiralty case of Talbot v. Seeman, although this may have been due to the perception of admiralty law as a unique field governed by custom rather than statute.

In most common law jurisdictions today, analogy is largely reserved for the interpretation of precedent. Analogizing a precedent to new facts is approximately the reverse of distinguishing a precedent, although the two are not exactly symmetrical.

=== Islamic law ===
In Islamic law, the practice of qiyas (قياس) embraces analogy as well as other related forms of interpretation. Qiyas includes for example argumentum a fortiori and reductio ad absurdum.

A classic example of analogical reasoning under qiyas is the extension of the Quranic prohibition on wine to cover all alcoholic beverages. The qiyas method was originally developed by the early Islamic jurist Abu Hanifa and is given particular prominence in the Hanafi school.

Qiyas is rejected by the Zahiri school, and was famously criticized by the Andalusian scholar Ibn Hazm. The Shia tradition also largely rejects qiyas. For example, al-Shaykh al-Mufid criticized the use of analogy to prohibit all intoxicating beverages, because some beverages could also have other properties that are more important to God. However, both Zahiri and Shia scholars have adopted more limited forms of analogical reasoning.

=== Socialist law ===
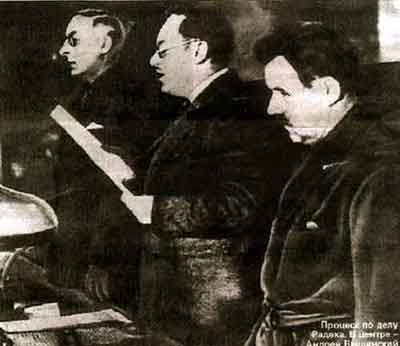
Prosecutor General Vyshinsky (center), reading an indictment

Attitudes toward analogy in socialist criminal law have varied. Acceptance of punishment by analogy has often been associated with legal nihilism.

Punishment by analogy was permitted under the Basic Principles of the Criminal Law of the USSR adopted in 1924 and the subsequent RSFSR Penal Code of 1926, which served as a model for the criminal codes of many Soviet republics. In practice punishment by analogy was rare and largely limited to political crimes. Stalin's 1936 call for legal stabilization reduced the use of analogy in Soviet criminal law, but the practice continued thanks to the advocacy of the legal theorist Andrey Vyshinsky, who championed the limited use of analogy. Legal reforms adopted in 1958, after Vyshinsky's death, eliminated the provision for punishment by analogy.

Punishment by analogy was also formerly permitted under the criminal law of the People's Republic of China; the practice was widespread under the largely uncodified criminal law of the early PRC. A 1934 statute of the Chinese Soviet Republic provided that counterrevolutionary crimes not covered by the statute "shall be punished according to the article in the Statute dealing with similar crimes". Efforts to reform Chinese criminal law along Soviet lines, including limiting or abolishing the use of analogy, failed in 1957 with the beginning of the Anti-Rightist Campaign. The failure of this reform effort marked a major split between the Soviet and Chinese approaches to criminal law. Punishment by analogy was codified in the 1980 PRC Criminal Law but was abolished in 1998.

Although most Eastern European countries adopted a version of Soviet criminal law following World War II, some never adopted punishment by analogy; these included Czechoslovakia, East Germany, Hungary, and Poland.

Among other countries in the socialist tradition, North Korea adopted punishment by analogy in 1950 but abolished it in the criminal code reform of 2004. Vietnam originally provided for punishment by analogy but abolished it in 1985.

=== Classical Hindu law ===
In classical Hindu law, the doctrine of atidesha (अतिदेश, atideśa), sometimes translated as "transference", developed in chapters 7 and 8 of the Purva Mimamsa Sutras was used to extend rules by analogy. Although composed by Jaimini in approximately the third century BCE, the Mimamsa sutras drew on older authorities and reflected a tradition dating to around the eighth century BCE. As formulated by Jaimini, atidesha was limited to drawing analogies from a model sacrifice (prakriti) to a partially similar sacrifice (Sanskrit: vikriti).

Even after the imposition of British justice, atidesha continued to be applied in British colonial courts, often relying on English translations of the relevant texts, for lawsuits between Hindus. For example, in the 1872 case of Tagore v. Tagore, the court applied atidesha to analogize the prohibition on gifts to an unborn person under Hindu law to also prohibit bequests to an unborn person. The use of atidesha continued until the 1956 codification of Hindu law.

Some Indian courts have more recently claimed to apply atidesha and other Mimamsa interpretive principles in circumstances outside of Hindu religious law. Justice B. N. Srikrishna criticized this practice and questioned whether these courts had properly applied Mimamsa principles.

=== Traditional Chinese law ===
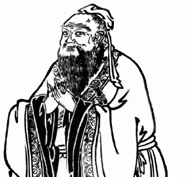
Portrait of Confucius giving a lecture

In traditional Chinese law, in contrast to most modern legal systems, magistrates were permitted to use analogy to extend criminal punishments to new situations. The use of analogy reflected a preference under Confucianism to avoid spelling out prohibitions in detail because doing so would encourage the public to merely do the bare minimum rather than aspiring to moral virtue. As Confucius put it:

If the people be led by laws, and uniformity sought to be given them by punishments, they will try to avoid the punishment, but have no sense of shame. If they be led by virtue, and uniformity sought to be given them by the rules of propriety, they will have the sense of shame, and moreover will become good.

In the Tang dynasty, punishment by analogy was codified in article 50 of the Tang Code, which permitted the magistrate to either analogize from a heavier penalty to show why a lighter one was appropriate in a particular case, or to analogize from a lighter penalty to show why a heavier one was appropriate. The Great Ming Code (1397–1644) imposed strict limits on the use of legal analogy. An official seeking to apply a provision of the Code to a situation not expressly covered in the Code or the Great Ming Commandment was required to send the proposed punishment to the Ministry of Justice for review followed by imperial approval. The use of analogy continued under the Great Qing Legal Code, which remained in effect until 1911. In one famous case, when a Qing literatus improperly used a word reserved for action by the emperor to refer to an action taken by his father, he was punished by analogy under a law prohibiting commoners from manufacturing silks bearing imperial symbols.

== By country ==
- Australia: In addition to conventional common law analogizing among precedents, Australian courts have recognized the "doctrine of analogy" as authorizing statutes to be used as authority in developing the common law by analogizing from statute. The doctrine requires a "consistent pattern of legislative policy", and has been applied for example to the trend toward the Crown assuming tort liability for the actions of its officers.
- Austria: Article 7 of the Austrian civil code provides for both analogia legis and analogia iuris to be used in situations in which "neither the wording nor the natural meaning of a statute" is sufficient to decide a case.
- Brazil: Brazilian law recognizes analogy, alongside custom and general principles of law, as a source of law that can be used where statutory law is silent. In addition, following 2015 amendments to the Brazilian Code of Civil Procedure, courts are required to apply precedents raised by the parties analogically or explain why doing so would be improper. In statutory interpretation, the Brazilian courts apply both analogia legis and analogia iuris. For example, the Supreme Federal Court first established same-sex common law marriage by analogia legis to the provision of the Brazilian civil code providing for opposite-sex common law marriage, and subsequently by analogia iuris to the underlying constitutional values.
- China: Analogical application of precedents identified by the Supreme People's Court as Guiding Cases has been mandatory since 2010. This practice is known as 参照 (cānzhào), sometimes translated as "reference" or as "following by analogy". In statutory law, the analogical extension of criminal statutes has been prohibited since 1998.
- Cuba: The Cuban Penal Code of 2022 expressly prohibits the creation of crimes by analogy.
- Ethiopia: The creation of crimes by analogy is expressly prohibited under the 2005 Criminal Code, and was also formerly prohibited under the 1957 Penal Code. The use of analogy to extend civil statutes is acceptable under Ethiopian law, although exceptional provisions may not be extended. Some observers have criticized the practice of analogical arguments on statutory application in Ethiopia as lacking sufficient discipline, with insufficient focus on the analogized provision's role in the Code.
- Iceland: Article 69 of the Constitution of Iceland allows criminal provisions to be extended by analogy, but only where the accused conduct is "totally analogous" to "conduct that constituted a criminal offence according to the law at the time when it was committed". This language, which is also found in Article 1 of the General Penal Code, was drawn from the 1869 Danish criminal code. The view that analogy can itself be a source of law is considered outdated, and the provision is interpreted as permitting the Icelandic courts only to broadly construe criminal laws to ensure equal application.
- Indonesia: Certain forms of punishment by analogy were permitted under the modifications of Dutch-era criminal law by Article 5, Paragraph 3(b) of the Emergency Law No. 1/1951 on Temporary Acts for Organizing Unity and Uniformization of Civil Courts Powers and Procedures. This 1951 law provided that acts considered criminal under the unwritten "living law" (hukum yang hidup) are subject to the sentence for the most similar crime under the Indonesian Criminal Code. In another form of punishment by analogy, in a famous case in 1983, Bismar Siregar held that the criminal code provision prohibiting theft by deception also applied to men persuading women to have sex through false promises of marriage; the Indonesian Supreme Court however rejected this holding in 1990, on the ground that "honor" was not a "good" to which that provision would apply. Punishment by analogy is prohibited under Article 1 of the 2023 Indonesian Criminal Code, which will take effect in 2026. The effect of this prohibition is not yet clear, as the Article 2 of the 2023 code also provides for punishment of crimes under the living law. The prohibition of punishment by analogy was controversial, and has been criticized for ignoring the Islamic principle of qiyas and for limiting the adaptability of the criminal law.
- Italy: The Italian Civil Code follows the Austrian language in calling on courts to use both analogia legis and analogia iuris to resolve cases.
- Philippines: Under the mixed legal system of Philippine law, the Supreme Court of the Philippines applies the casus omissus rule to prohibit analogical extension of statutes.
- Portugal: The Portuguese Civil Code adopts the Swiss provision calling on courts to extend statutes to cover new situations by applying the law that it believes the legislature would have enacted had it been faced with such a case. In addition, Article 11 of the Code codifies the rule that exceptional rules (normas excepcionais) cannot be extended by analogy, although they can be broadly construed.
- South Africa: The South African legal system is a blend of English common law, which does not permit statutory analogies, and Roman-Dutch civil law, which contains a rich tradition of such analogies. However, the South African courts follow a strict version of the English casus omissus rule, avoiding analogical extensions of statutes; exceptions are rare and controversial.
- South Korea: The Supreme Court of South Korea has approved the use of statutory analogy (유추적용, yuchujeokyong) in a 2021 case allowing the extension of a parent's right to seek child support, as authorized under Article 837 of the South Korean Civil Code, to a court-appointed guardian.
- Sweden: Analogical application of statutes is permitted in civil cases. It was invoked for example by the Swedish Supreme Court in a 2000 case in which the court extended the statute governing the commissions of licensed real estate agents to also cover commissions charged by unlicensed real estate agents. The use of analogy in construing criminal statutes is forbidden.
- Ukraine: Article 8 of the Civil Code of Ukraine expressly recognizes both analogia legis and analogia iuris as valid methods of judicial interpretation.
- United Kingdom: The United Kingdom consists of multiple countries:
  - England: The English courts generally follow the casus omissus rule in declining to extend statutes by analogy. As in other common law jurisdictions there is some disagreement on this point, and the rigid literalism of 19th-century English law is no longer followed.
  - Scotland: The Court of Session may fill legislative gaps by the exercise of its high equitable jurisdiction, known as the nobile officium, although this power is only rarely exercised. The Court of Session also applies analogy in determining which cases are appropriate for exercising the nobile officium.
- United States: The use of precedent in the common law jurisdictions that make up most of the United States relies heavily on analogy between similar cases. There is also a rich although frequently controversial tradition of using analogy in United States constitutional law. Using analogy to extend the scope of statutes, however, is typically regarded as a breach of the separation of powers established under the United States Constitution. In contrast, in the civil law legal system of Louisiana, analogical statutory interpretation is permitted under Article 21 of the Louisiana Civil Code and is regarded as a form of judicial interpretation rather than lawmaking. Likewise, in Puerto Rican law, Section 5343 of the Civil Code provides for analogical application of legal norms.

== See also ==
- Analogy

== Works cited ==
- Baade, Hans W. (1994). "The Casus Omissus: A Pre-History of Statutory Analogy". Syracuse Journal of International Law and Commerce. 20: 45–94 – via HeinOnline.
- Beaucamp, Guy (March 2009). "Zum Analogieverbot im öffentlichen Recht". Archiv des öffentlichen Rechts (in German). 134 (1): 83–105. JSTOR 44317721.
- Canale, Damiano; Tuzet, Giovanni (2017). "Analogical Reasoning and Extensive Interpretation". ARSP: Archiv für Rechts- und Sozialphilosophie / Archives for Philosophy of Law and Social Philosophy. 103 (1). JSTOR 45175243.
- Damele, Giovanni (2014). "Analogia Legis and Analogia Iuris: An Overview from a Rhetorical Perspective". In Ribeiro, Henrique Jales (ed.). Systematic Approaches to Argument by Analogy. Argumentation Library. Vol. 25. Cham: Springer International Publishing. pp. 243–256. doi:10.1007/978-3-319-06334-8_14. ISBN 978-3-319-06334-8.
- Eskridge, William N. Jr. (June 2001). "All about Words: Early Understandings of the "Judicial Power" in Statutory Interpretation, 1776-1806" (PDF). Columbia Law Review. 101 (5): 990–1106. doi:10.2307/1123771. JSTOR 1123771.
- Giovannetti, Dana (1984). "The Principle of Analogy in Sino-Soviet Criminal Laws". Dalhousie Law Journal. 8 (2): 394.
- Golding, Martin (2018). "Argument by analogy in the law". In Kaptein, Hendrik; Van der Velden, Bastiaan (eds.). Analogy and Exemplary Reasoning in Legal Discourse. Amsterdam University Press. pp. 123–136. doi:10.5117/9789462985902/ch8. ISBN 9789462985902.
- Greenawalt, Kent (2012). Statutory and Common Law Interpretation. Oxford Academic. doi:10.1093/acprof:oso/9780199756148.003.0009. ISBN 9780199756148.
- Hermann, Mikołaj (2018). "How Can Ratio Legis Help a Lawyer to Interpret a Legal Text? Employing the Purpose of a Regulation for Legal Interpretation". In Klappstein, Verena; Dybowski, Maciej (eds.). Ratio Legis: Philosophical and Theoretical Perspectives. Cham: Springer Verlag. pp. 187–205.
- Langenbucher, Katja (1998). "Argument by Analogy In European Law". The Cambridge Law Journal. 57 (3): 481–521. doi:10.1017/S0008197398003031.
- Macagno, Fabrizio (2014). "Analogia Legis and Analogia Iuris: An Overview from a Rhetorical Perspective". In Ribeiro, Henrique Jales (ed.). Analogy and Redefinition. Argumentation Library. Vol. 25. Cham: Springer International Publishing. pp. 243–256. doi:10.1007/978-3-319-06334-8_14. ISBN 978-3-319-06334-8.
- Manning, John F. (November 2001). "Deriving Rules of Statutory Interpretation from the Constitution". Columbia Law Review. 101 (7): 1648–1680. doi:10.2307/1123810. JSTOR 1123810.
- Maris, Cees W. (1991). "Milking the Meter: On analogy, universalisability and world views". In Nerhot, Patrick (ed.). Legal Knowledge and Analogy. Law and Philosophy Library. Vol. 13. Dordrecht: Springer. doi:10.1007/978-94-011-3260-2_4.
- Ruskola, Teemu (1994). "Law, Sexual Morality, and Gender Equality in Qing and Communist China" (PDF). Yale Law Journal. 103: 2531–2565.
- Sherwin, Emily (1999). "A Defense of Analogical Reasoning in Law". University of Chicago Law Review. 66 (4).
- Srikrishna, B. N. (2004). "Maxwell v. Mimamsa". Student Bar Review. 16: 1–14. JSTOR 44308380.
- Thorne, Samuel Edmund (1942). "Introduction". A Discourse Upon the Exposicion & Understandinge of Statutes: With Sir Thomas Egerton's Additions : Edited from Manuscripts in the Huntington Library. Huntington Library.
- van der Velden, Bastiaan (2018). "Analogy in the strict liability rules in the Dutch Civil Code". In Kaptein, Hendrik; Van der Velden, Bastiaan (eds.). Analogy and Exemplary Reasoning in Legal Discourse. Amsterdam University Press. pp. 165–175. doi:10.5117/9789462985902/ch10. ISBN 9789462985902.
- Vikør, Knut S. (2005). Between God and the Sultan: A History of Islamic Law. Oxford University Press. ISBN 9780195223989.
- Wendehorst, Christiane (October 2011). "Methodennormen in kontinentaleuropäischen Kodifikationen". Rabels Zeitschrift für ausländisches und internationales Privatrecht / The Rabel Journal of Comparative and International Private Law (in German). 75 (4): 730–763. JSTOR 41304258.
