= Analogia legis =

Analogia legis, also known as statutory analogy or analogy from statute, is a method of statutory interpretation in which the legal principle applicable to a fact pattern not covered by a legal norm is determined by analogy to a norm that governs a comparable situation.

The analogy is typically governed by the ratio legis, or underlying purpose of the statute. For example, in a 2010 decision, the Italian Constitutional Court determined that a statute allowing drivers of public transport vehicles to carry only an authenticated photocopy of the vehicle registration, rather than the originals, also extended to waste haulers, even though they were not expressly covered by the statute, because the same legislative purpose applied in both cases.

In common law jurisdictions, analogia legis may also be applied to the interpretation of precedent. For example, in Popov v. Hayashi, which involved a baseball that was caught by two different people, the California Superior Court was faced with a fact pattern not governed by established legal standards for possession. The court reasoned by analogy with a New Jersey case involving children tossing an abandoned sock that turned out to contain money in determining that possession required both physical control and intent, and that under the circumstances it was appropriate to order an equitable division among the two people who caught the baseball.

Analogia legis is formally recognized in the civil codes of some jurisdictions, including that of Portugal, which provides that "cases for which the law does not provide shall be governed by the norm applicable to similar cases".

When analogia legis is not possible then analogia iuris may apply, in which the analogy is derived not from a statute but from fundamental legal or constitutional principles. However, although the distinction between analogia legis and analogia juris is traditional, some authorities have argued that there is no tenable distinction between them, as both involve the same interpretive techniques.

== See also ==
- Analogy
- Ratio legis

== Works cited ==
- Damele, Giovanni (2014). "Analogia Legis and Analogia Iuris: An Overview from a Rhetorical Perspective". In Ribeiro, Henrique Jales (ed.). Systematic Approaches to Argument by Analogy. Argumentation Library. Vol. 25. Cham: Springer International Publishing. pp. 243–256. doi:10.1007/978-3-319-06334-8_14. ISBN 978-3-319-06334-8.
- Hermann, Mikołaj (2018). "How Can Ratio Legis Help a Lawyer to Interpret a Legal Text? Employing the Purpose of a Regulation for Legal Interpretation". In Klappstein, Verena; Dybowski, Maciej (eds.). Ratio Legis: Philosophical and Theoretical Perspectives. Cham: Springer Verlag. pp. 187–205.
- Macagno, Fabrizio (2014). "Analogia Legis and Analogia Iuris: An Overview from a Rhetorical Perspective". In Ribeiro, Henrique Jales (ed.). Analogy and Redefinition. Argumentation Library. Vol. 25. Cham: Springer International Publishing. pp. 243–256. doi:10.1007/978-3-319-06334-8_14. ISBN 978-3-319-06334-8.
