= Logician (disambiguation) =

A Logician is an expert or student of logic

A Logician may also refer to:

- A follower of the School of Names
- A Logician Devil, a 1951 painting by Salvador Dalí
- Logician (horse) (foaled 2016), a British thoroughbred horse

== See also ==
- Logarithm
- Logic (disambiguation)
- Logik (disambiguation)
- Logistic (disambiguation)
