= Analogia iuris =

Method of statutory interpretation

Analogia iuris is a method of statutory interpretation in which gaps in existing law are filled by reference to overarching principles of law. Analogia iuris can be contrasted with analogia legis, whereby legal consequences arise from the wording of statutes. In analogia iuris, the court constructs a new, previously unarticulated general principle of law.

A prominent example of analogia iuris occurred in the Dutch case of Quint v. Te Poel, decided by the Dutch Supreme Court in 1959, in which homebuilders sought compensation from the owner of the property on which they had built homes, although the owner was not a party to the homebuilders' contract. The Dutch Civil Code of 1838, which was then in effect, contained clauses prohibiting specific examples of unjust enrichment but did not contain any general prohibition on unjust enrichment. The court generalized from these existing provisions to create a new cause of action for unjust enrichment, allowing the builders to recover from the property owner.

These methods of analogia iuris and analogia legis date to medieval times, when they were used to fill in the gaps in coverage of the Codex of Justinian. However, the modern distinction between the two methods was first articulated in 1797 by the German jurist Carl Ludwig Wilhelm von Grolmann. Grolmann did not use the Latin terms, but referred to analogia iuris and analogia legis respectively as Rechtsanalogie and Gesetzesanalogie. A more thorough justification of the distinction between these two forms of analogy was subsequently articulated by Carl Georg von Wächter.

== See also ==
- Analogy

== Works cited ==
- Damele, Giovanni (2014). "Analogia Legis and Analogia Iuris: An Overview from a Rhetorical Perspective". In Ribeiro, Henrique Jales (ed.). Systematic Approaches to Argument by Analogy. Argumentation Library. Vol. 25. Cham: Springer International Publishing. pp. 243–256. doi:10.1007/978-3-319-06334-8_14. ISBN 978-3-319-06334-8.
- Macagno, Fabrizio (2014). "Analogia Legis and Analogia Iuris: An Overview from a Rhetorical Perspective". In Ribeiro, Henrique Jales (ed.). Analogy and Redefinition. Argumentation Library. Vol. 25. Cham: Springer International Publishing. pp. 243–256. doi:10.1007/978-3-319-06334-8_14. ISBN 978-3-319-06334-8.
- Maris, Cees W. (1991). "Milking the Meter: On analogy, universalisability and world views". In Nerhot, Patrick (ed.). Legal Knowledge and Analogy. Law and Philosophy Library. Vol. 13. Dordrecht: Springer. doi:10.1007/978-94-011-3260-2_4.
