= Analogy =

Form of figurative language

Analogy is a comparison or correspondence between two things (or two groups of things) because of a third element that they are considered to share.

Logically, it is an inference or an argument from one particular to another particular, as opposed to deduction, induction, and abduction. It is also used where at least one of the premises, or the conclusion, is general rather than particular in nature. It has the general form A is to B as C is to D.

In a broader sense, analogical reasoning is a cognitive process of transferring meaning or information of a particular subject (the analog, or source) onto another (the target); and also the linguistic expression corresponding to such a process. The term analogy can also refer to the relation between the source and the target themselves, which is often (though not always) a similarity, as in the biological notion of analogy.

Ernest Rutherford's model of the atom (modified by Niels Bohr) made an analogy between the atom and the Solar System.

Analogy plays a significant role in human thought processes. It has been argued that analogy lies at "the core of cognition".

== Etymology ==
The English word analogy derives from the Latin analogia, itself derived from the Greek ἀναλογία, "proportion", from ana- "upon, according to" [also "again", "anew"] + logos "ratio" [also "word, speech, reckoning"].

== Models and theories ==
Analogy plays a significant role in problem solving, as well as decision making, argumentation, perception, generalization, memory, creativity, invention, prediction, emotion, explanation, conceptualization and communication. It lies behind basic tasks such as the identification of places, objects and people, for example, in face perception and facial recognition systems. Hofstadter has argued that analogy is "the core of cognition".

An analogy is not a figure of speech but a kind of thought. Specific analogical language uses exemplification, comparisons, metaphors, similes, allegories, and parables, but not metonymy. Phrases like and so on, and the like, as if, and the very word like also rely on an analogical understanding by the receiver of a message including them. Analogy is important not only in ordinary language and common sense (where proverbs and idioms give many examples of its application) but also in science, philosophy, law and the humanities.

The concepts of association, comparison, correspondence, mathematical and morphological homology, homomorphism, iconicity, isomorphism, metaphor, resemblance, and similarity are closely related to analogy. In cognitive linguistics, the notion of conceptual metaphor may be equivalent to that of analogy. Analogy is also a basis for any comparative arguments as well as experiments whose results are transmitted to objects that have been not under examination (e.g., experiments on rats when results are applied to humans).

Analogy has been studied and discussed since classical antiquity by philosophers, scientists, theologists and lawyers. The last few decades have shown a renewed interest in analogy, most notably in cognitive science.

=== Development ===
- Archytas, a contemporary of Plato, described three kinds of analogy: mathematical, harmonic, and geometric: the last being the true analogy
- Aristotle identified analogy in works such as Metaphysics and Nicomachean Ethics
- Roman lawyers used analogical reasoning and the Greek word analogia.
- In Islamic logic, analogical reasoning was used for the process of qiyas in Islamic sharia law and fiqh jurisprudence.
- Medieval lawyers distinguished analogia legis and analogia iuris (see below).
- The Middle Ages saw an increased use and theorization of analogy.
- In Christian scholastic theology, analogical arguments were accepted in order to explain the attributes of God.
  - Aquinas made a distinction between equivocal, univocal and analogical terms, the last being those like healthy that have different but related meanings. Not only a person can be "healthy", but also the food that is good for health (see the contemporary distinction between polysemy and homonymy).
  - Thomas Cajetan wrote an influential treatise on analogy. In all of these cases, the wide Platonic and Aristotelian notion of analogy was preserved.

Cajetan named several kinds of analogy that had been used but previously unnamed, particularly:

- Analogy of attribution (analogia attributionis) or improper proportionality, e.g., "This food is healthy."
- Analogy of proportionality (analogia proportionalitatis) or proper proportionality, e.g., "2 is to 1 as 4 is to 2", or "the goodness of humans is relative to their essence as the goodness of God is relative to God's essence."
- Metaphor, e.g., steely determination.

=== Identity of relation ===
In ancient Greek the word αναλογια (analogia) originally meant proportionality, in the mathematical sense, and it was indeed sometimes translated to Latin as proportio. Analogy was understood as identity of relation between any two ordered pairs, whether of mathematical nature or not.

Analogy and abstraction are different cognitive processes, and analogy is often an easier one. This analogy is not comparing all the properties between a hand and a foot, but rather comparing the relationship between a hand and its palm to a foot and its sole. While a hand and a foot have many dissimilarities, the analogy focuses on their similarity in having an inner surface.

The same notion of analogy was used in the US-based SAT college admission tests, that included "analogy questions" in the form "A is to B as C is to what?" For example, "Hand is to palm as foot is to ____?" These questions were usually given in the Aristotelian format: HAND : PALM : : FOOT : ____ While most competent English speakers will immediately give the right answer to the analogy question (sole), it is more difficult to identify and describe the exact relation that holds both between pairs such as hand and palm, and between foot and sole. This relation is not apparent in some lexical definitions of palm and sole, where the former is defined as the inner surface of the hand, and the latter as the underside of the foot.

Kant's Critique of Judgment held to this notion of analogy, arguing that there can be exactly the same relation between two completely different objects.

=== Shared abstraction ===
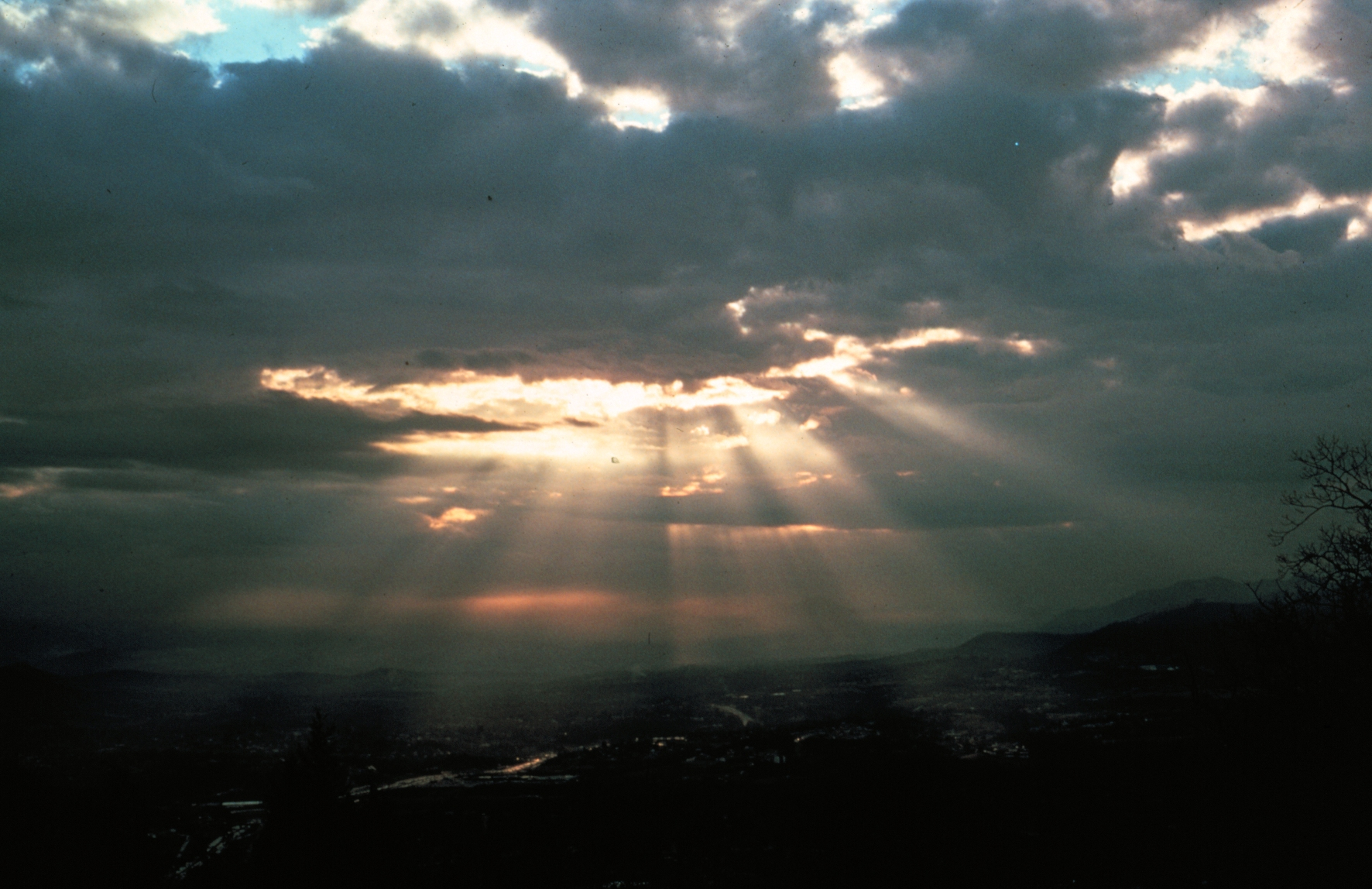
In several cultures, the Sun is the source of an analogy to God.

Greek philosophers such as Plato and Aristotle used a wider notion of analogy. They saw analogy as a shared abstraction. Analogous objects did not share necessarily a relation, but also an idea, a pattern, a regularity, an attribute, an effect or a philosophy. These authors also accepted that comparisons, metaphors and "images" (allegories) could be used as arguments, and sometimes they called them analogies. Analogies should also make those abstractions easier to understand and give confidence to those who use them.

James Francis Ross in Portraying Analogy (1982), the first substantive examination of the topic since Cajetan's De Nominum Analogia, demonstrated that analogy is a systematic and universal feature of natural languages, with identifiable and law-like characteristics which explain how the meanings of words in a sentence are interdependent.

=== Special case of induction ===
Ibn Taymiyya, Francis Bacon and later John Stuart Mill argued that analogy is simply a special case of induction. In their view, analogy is an inductive inference from common known attributes to another probable common attribute, which is known about only in the source of the analogy, in the following form:

Premises
a is C, D, E, F, G
b is C, D, E, F
Conclusion
b is probably G.

=== Shared structure ===
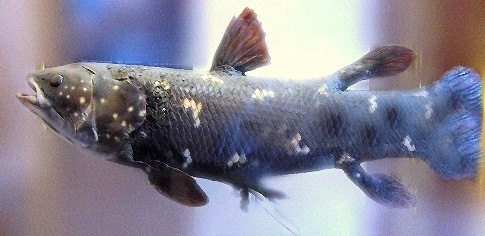
According to Shelley (2003), the study of the coelacanth drew heavily on analogies from other fish.

Contemporary cognitive scientists use a wide notion of analogy, extensionally close to that of Plato and Aristotle, but framed by Gentner's (1983) structure-mapping theory. The same idea of mapping between source and target is used by conceptual metaphor and conceptual blending theorists. Structure mapping theory concerns both psychology and computer science. According to this view, analogy depends on the mapping or alignment of the elements of source and target. The mapping takes place not only between objects, but also between relations of objects and between relations of relations. The whole mapping yields the assignment of a predicate or a relation to the target. Structure mapping theory has been applied and has found considerable confirmation in psychology. It has had reasonable success in computer science and artificial intelligence (see below). Some studies extended the approach to specific subjects, such as metaphor and similarity.

== Applications and types ==
=== Logic ===
Logicians analyze how analogical reasoning is used in arguments from analogy.

An analogy can be stated using is to and as when representing the analogous relationship between two pairs of expressions, for example, "Smile is to mouth, as wink is to eye." In the field of mathematics and logic, this can be formalized with colon notation to represent the relationships, using single colon for ratio, and double colon for equality.

In the field of testing, the colon notation of ratios and equality is often borrowed, so that the example above might be rendered, "Smile : mouth :: wink : eye" and pronounced the same way.

=== Linguistics ===
In historical linguistics and word formation, analogy is the process that alters words-forms perceived as breaking rules or ignoring general patterns to more typical forms that follow them. For example, the English verb help once had the simple past-tense form holp and the past participle form holpen. These older forms have now been discarded and replaced by helped, which came about through the analogy that many other past-tense forms use the -ed ending (jumped, carried, defeated, etc.). This is called morphological leveling. Analogies do not always lead to words shifting to fit rules; sometimes, they can also leading to the breaking of rules; one example is the American English past tense form of dive: dove, formed on analogy with words such as drive to drove or strive to strove.

- Neologisms (new words) can also be formed by analogy with existing words. A good example is software, formed by analogy with hardware; other analogous neologisms such as firmware and vapourware have followed. Another example is the humorous term underwhelm, formed by analogy with overwhelm.
- Some people present analogy as an alternative to generative rules for explaining the productive formation of structures such as words. Others argue that they are in fact the same and that rules are analogies that have essentially become standard parts of the linguistic system, whereas clearer cases of analogy have simply not (yet) done so (e.g. Langacker 1987.445–447). This view agrees with the current views of analogy in cognitive science which are discussed above.

Analogy is also a term used in the Neogrammarian school of thought as a catch-all to describe any morphological change in a language that cannot be explained merely sound change or borrowing.

=== Science ===
Analogies are mainly used as a means of creating new ideas and hypotheses, or testing them, which is called a heuristic function of analogical reasoning.

Analogical arguments can also be probative, meaning that they serve as a means of proving the rightness of particular theses and theories. This application of analogical reasoning in science is debatable. Analogy can help prove important theories, especially in those kinds of science in which logical or empirical proof is not possible such as theology, philosophy or cosmology when it relates to those areas of the cosmos (the universe) that are beyond any data-based observation and knowledge about them stems from the human insight and thinking outside the senses.

Analogy can be used in theoretical and applied sciences in the form of models or simulations which can be considered as strong indications of probable correctness. Other, much weaker, analogies may also assist in understanding and describing nuanced or key functional behaviours of systems that are otherwise difficult to grasp or prove. For instance, an analogy used in physics textbooks compares electrical circuits to hydraulic circuits. Another example is the analogue ear based on electrical, electronic or mechanical devices.

==== Mathematics ====
Some types of analogies can have a precise mathematical formulation through the concept of isomorphism. In detail, this means that if two mathematical structures are of the same type, an analogy between them can be thought of as a bijection which preserves some or all of the relevant structure. For example, $\mathbb{R}^2$ and $\mathbb{C}$ are isomorphic as vector spaces, but the complex numbers, $\mathbb{C}$, have more structure than $\mathbb{R}^2$ does: $\mathbb{C}$ is a field as well as a vector space.

Category theory takes the idea of mathematical analogy much further with the concept of functors. Given two categories C and D, a functor f from C to D can be thought of as an analogy between C and D, because f has to map objects of C to objects of D and arrows of C to arrows of D in such a way that the structure of their respective parts is preserved. This is similar to the structure mapping theory of analogy of Dedre Gentner, because it formalises the idea of analogy as a function which makes certain conditions true.

==== Artificial intelligence ====
Large Language Model (LLM) may perform analogy by applying the mathematical difference between two vectors in multi-dimensional space, representing two concepts (e.g dog and puppy), to another vector (e.g. for cat) to find an analogous vector (e.g. ideally, something close to the vector for kitten.) (Not all vector operations are analogical: the commonly cited example from Natural Language Processing (NLP) KING - MAN + WOMAN = QUEEN is not.)

The issue of how Large Language Models relate to human analogical thinking is a matter of current research (as of 2025).

==== Pre-LLM ====
By 2006, a computer algorithm using the Vector Space Model (VSM) had achieved human-level performance on multiple-choice analogy questions from the SAT test. The algorithm measures the similarity of relations between pairs of words (e.g., the similarity between the pairs HAND:PALM and FOOT:SOLE) by statistically analysing a large collection of text. It answers SAT questions by selecting the choice with the highest relational similarity.

The analogical reasoning in the human mind is free of the false inferences plaguing conventional artificial intelligence models, (called systematicity). Steven Phillips and William H. Wilson use category theory to mathematically demonstrate how such reasoning could arise naturally by using relationships between the internal arrows that keep the internal structures of the categories rather than the mere relationships between the objects (called "representational states"). Thus, the mind, and more intelligent AIs, may use analogies between domains whose internal structures transform naturally and reject those that do not.

Keith Holyoak and Paul Thagard (1997) developed their multiconstraint theory within structure mapping theory. They defend that the "coherence" of an analogy depends on structural consistency, semantic similarity and purpose. Structural consistency is the highest when the analogy is an isomorphism, although lower levels can be used as well. Similarity demands that the mapping connects similar elements and relationships between source and target, at any level of abstraction. It is the highest when there are identical relations and when connected elements have many identical attributes. An analogy achieves its purpose if it helps solve the problem at hand. The multiconstraint theory faces some difficulties when there are multiple sources, but these can be overcome. Hummel and Holyoak (2005) recast the multiconstraint theory within a neural network architecture. A problem for the multiconstraint theory arises from its concept of similarity, which, in this respect, is not obviously different from analogy itself. Computer applications demand that there are some identical attributes or relations at some level of abstraction. The model was extended (Doumas, Hummel, and Sandhofer, 2008) to learn relations from unstructured examples (providing the only current account of how symbolic representations can be learned from examples).

Mark Keane and Brayshaw (1988) developed their Incremental Analogy Machine (IAM) to include working memory constraints as well as structural, semantic and pragmatic constraints, so that a subset of the base analogue is selected and mapping from base to target occurs in series. Empirical evidence shows that humans are better at using and creating analogies when the information is presented in an order where an item and its analogue are placed together.

Eqaan Doug and his team challenged the shared structure theory and mostly its applications in computer science. They argue that there is no clear line between perception, including high-level perception, and analogical thinking. In fact, analogy occurs not only after, but also before and at the same time as high-level perception. In high-level perception, humans make representations by selecting relevant information from low-level stimuli. Perception is necessary for analogy, but analogy is also necessary for high-level perception. Chalmers et al. concludes that analogy actually is high-level perception. Forbus et al. (1998) claim that this is only a metaphor. It has been argued (Morrison and Dietrich 1995) that Hofstadter's and Gentner's groups do not defend opposite views, but are instead dealing with different aspects of analogy.

Based on Hofstadter's ideas, abstract analogy-making tasks (using both perceptual and symbolic inputs) may be learned by a connectionist network using a two-step, feed-forward network.

==== Anatomy ====
In anatomy, two anatomical structures are considered to be analogous when they serve similar functions but are not evolutionarily related, such as the legs of vertebrates and the legs of insects. Analogous structures are the result of independent evolution and should be contrasted with structures which shared an evolutionary line.

==== Engineering ====
Often a physical prototype is built to model and represent some other physical object. For example, wind tunnels are used to test scale models of wings and aircraft which are analogous to (correspond to) full-size wings and aircraft.

For example, the MONIAC (an analogue computer) used the flow of water in its pipes as an analogue to the flow of money in an economy.

==== Cybernetics ====
Where two or more biological or physical participants meet, they communicate and the stresses produced describe internal models of the participants. Pask in his conversation theory asserts an analogy that describes both similarities and differences between any pair of the participants' internal models or concepts exists.

==== History ====
In historical science, comparative historical analysis often uses the concept of analogy and analogical reasoning. Recent methods involving calculation operate on large document archives, allowing for analogical or corresponding terms from the past to be found as a response to random questions by users (e.g., Myanmar - Burma) and explained.

=== Morality ===
Analogical reasoning plays a very important part in morality. This may be because morality is supposed to be impartial and fair. If it is wrong to do something in a situation A, and situation B corresponds to A in all related features, then it is also wrong to perform that action in situation B. Moral particularism accepts such reasoning, instead of deduction and induction, since only the first can be used regardless of any moral principles.

=== Psychology ===
==== Structure mapping theory ====
Structure mapping, originally proposed by Dedre Gentner, is a theory in psychology that describes the psychological processes involved in reasoning through, and learning from, analogies. More specifically, this theory aims to describe how familiar knowledge, or knowledge about a base domain, can be used to inform an individual's understanding of a less familiar idea, or a target domain. According to this theory, individuals view their knowledge of ideas, or domains, as interconnected structures. In other words, a domain is viewed as consisting of objects, their properties, and the relationships that characterise their interactions. The process of analogy then involves:

1. Recognising similar structures between the base and target domains.
2. Finding deeper similarities by mapping other relationships of a base domain to the target domain.
3. Cross-checking those findings against existing knowledge of the target domain.

In general, it has been found that people prefer analogies where the two systems correspond highly to each other (e.g. have similar relationships across the domains as opposed to just having similar objects across domains) when these people try to compare and contrast the systems. This is also known as the systematicity principle.

An example that has been used to illustrate structure mapping theory comes from Gentner and Gentner (1983) and uses the base domain of flowing water and the target domain of electricity. In a system of flowing water, the water is carried through pipes and the rate of water flow is determined by the pressure of the water towers or hills. This relationship corresponds to that of electricity flowing through a circuit. In a circuit, the electricity is carried through wires and the current, or rate of flow of electricity, is determined by the voltage, or electrical pressure. Given the similarity in structure, or structural alignment, between these domains, structure mapping theory would predict that relationships from one of these domains, would be inferred in the other using analogy.

===== Children =====
Children do not always need prompting to make comparisons in order to learn abstract relationships. Eventually, children undergo a relational shift, after which they begin seeing similar relations across different situations instead of merely looking at matching objects. This is critical in their cognitive development as continuing to focus on specific objects would reduce children's ability to learn abstract patterns and reason analogically. Interestingly, some researchers have proposed that children's basic brain functions (i.e., working memory and inhibitory control) do not drive this relational shift. Instead, it is driven by their relational knowledge, such as having labels for the objects that make the relationships clearer(see previous section). However, there is not enough evidence to determine whether the relational shift is actually because basic brain functions become better or relational knowledge becomes deeper.

Additionally, research has identified several factors that may increase the likelihood that a child may spontaneously engage in comparison and learn an abstract relationship, without the need for prompts. Comparison is more likely when the objects to be compared are close together in space and/or time, are highly similar (although not so similar that they match, which interfere with identifying relationships), or share common labels.

=== Law ===
In law, analogy is a method of resolving issues on which there is no previous authority. The legal use of analogy is distinguished by the need to use a legally relevant basis for drawing an analogy between two situations. It may be applied to various forms of legal authority, including statutory law and case law.

In the civil law tradition, analogy is most typically used for filling gaps in a statutory scheme. In the common law tradition, it is most typically used for extending the scope of precedent. The use of analogy in both traditions is broadly described by the traditional maxim Ubi eadem est ratio, ibi idem ius (where the reason is the same, the law is the same).

=== Teaching strategies ===
Analogies as defined in rhetoric are a comparison between words, but an analogy more generally can also be used to illustrate and teach. To enlighten pupils on the relations between or within certain concepts, items or phenomena, a teacher may refer to other concepts, items or phenomena that pupils are more familiar with. It may help to create or clarify one theory (or theoretical model) via the workings of another theory (or theoretical model). Thus an analogy, as used in teaching, would be comparing a topic that students are already familiar with, with a new topic that is being introduced, so that students can get a better understanding of the new topic by relating back to existing knowledge. This can be particularly helpful when the analogy serves across different disciplines: indeed, there are various teaching innovations now emerging that use sight-based analogies for teaching and research across subjects such as science and the humanities.

=== Religion ===
==== Catholicism ====
The Fourth Lateran Council of 1215 taught: For between creator and creature there can be noted no similarity so great that a greater dissimilarity cannot be seen between them.

The theological exploration of this subject is called the analogia entis. The consequence of this theory is that all true statements concerning God (excluding the concrete details of Jesus' earthly life) are rough analogies, without implying any falsehood. Such analogical and true statements would include God is, God is Love, God is a consuming fire, God is near to all who call him, or God as Trinity, where being, love, fire, distance, number must be classed as analogies that allow human cognition of what is infinitely beyond positive or negative language.

The use of theological statements in syllogisms must take into account their analogical essence, in that every analogy breaks down when stretched beyond its intended meaning.

==== Doctrine of the Trinity ====
In traditional Christian doctrine, the Trinity is a Mystery of Faith that has been revealed, not something obvious or derivable from first principles or found in any thing in the created world. Because of this, the use of analogies to understand the Trinity is common and perhaps necessary.

The Trinity is a combination of the words "tri," meaning "three," and "unity," meaning "one." The "Threeness" refers to the persons of the Trinity, while the "Oneness" refers to substance or being.

Medieval Cistercian monk Bernard of Clairveaux used the analogy of a kiss:

"[...]truly the kiss[...]is common both to him who kisses and to him who is kissed. [...]If, as is properly understood, the Father is he who kisses, the Son he who is kissed, then it cannot be wrong to see in the kiss the Holy Spirit, for he is the imperturbable peace of the Father and the Son, their unshakable bond, their undivided love, their indivisible unity."

— St. Bernard of Clairveaux, Semons on Song of Songs, Sermon 8: The Holy Spirit, the Kiss of the Mouth

Many analogies have been used to explain the Trinity, however, all analogies fail when taken too far. Examples of these are the analogies that state that the Trinity is like water and its different states (solid, liquid, gas) or like an egg with its different parts (shell, yolk, and egg white). However, these analogies, if taken too far, could teach the heresies of modalism (water states) and partialism (parts of egg), which are contrary to the Christian understanding of the Trinity.

Other analogies exist. The analogy of notes of a chord, say C major, is a sufficient analogy for the Trinity. The notes C, E, and G individually fill the whole of the "heard" space, but when all notes come together, we have a homogenized sound within the same space with distinctive, equal notes. One more analogy used is one that uses the mythological dog, Cerberus, that guards the gates of Hades. While the dog itself is a single organism—speaking to its substance—Cerberus has different centers of awareness due to its three heads, each of which has the same dog nature.

==== Protestantism ====
In some Protestant theology, "analogy" may itself be used analogously in terms, more in a sense of "rule" or "exemplar": for example the concept "analogia fidei" has been proposed as an alternative to the concept analogia entis but named analogously.

==== Islam ====
Islamic jurisprudence makes ample use of analogy as a means of making conclusions from outside sources of law. The bounds and rules employed to make analogical deduction vary greatly between madhhabs and to a lesser extent individual scholars. It is nonetheless a generally accepted source of law within jurisprudential epistemology, with the chief opposition to it forming the dhahiri (ostensiblist) school.

== See also ==
- Argumentum a contrario
- Argumentum a fortiori
- Case-based reasoning
- Casuistry
- Commonsense reasoning
- Conceptual blending
- Duck test
- False analogy
- Hypocatastasis
- I know it when I see it
- Intuitive statistics
- Metaphor
- Parable
- Sensemaking

== Sources ==
- Cajetan, Tommaso De Vio, (1498), De Nominum Analogia, P.N. Zammit (ed.), 1934, The Analogy of Names, Koren, Henry J. and Bushinski, Edward A (trans.), 1953, Pittsburgh: Duquesne University Press.
- Chalmers, D.J. et al. (1991). Chalmers, D.J., French, R.M., Hofstadter, D., High-Level Perception, Representation, and Analogy.
- Coelho, Ivo (2010). "Analogy." ACPI Encyclopedia of Philosophy. Ed. Johnson J. Puthenpurackal. Bangalore: ATC. 1:64-68.
- Doumas, L. A. A., Hummel, J.E., and Sandhofer, C. (2008). A Theory of the Discovery and Predication of Relational Concepts. Psychological Review, 115, 1-43.
- Drescher, F (2017). "Analogy in Thomas Aquinas and Ludwig Wittgenstein. A comparison". New Blackfriars. 99 (1081): 346–359. doi:10.1111/nbfr.12273.
- Forbus, Kenneth D.; Gentner, Dedre; Markman, Arthur B.; Ferguson, Ronald W. (1998). "Analogy Just Looks Like High Level Perception: Why a Domain-General Approach to Analogical Mapping Is Right" (PDF). Journal of Experimental and Theoretical Artificial Intelligence. 10 (2). Taylor & Francis: 231–257. ISSN 0952-813X. Archived from the original (PDF) on 25 May 2006.
- Gentner, D. (1983). Structure-mapping: A theoretical framework for analogy. Cognitive Science, 7, 155–170. (Reprinted in A. Collins & E. E. Smith (Eds.), Readings in cognitive science: A perspective from psychology and artificial intelligence. Palo Alto, CA: Kaufmann).
- Gentner, D., Holyoak, K.J., Kokinov, B. (Eds.) (2001). The Analogical Mind: Perspectives from Cognitive Science. Cambridge, MA, MIT Press, ISBN 0-262-57139-0
- Hofstadter, D. (2001). Analogy as the Core of Cognition, in Dedre Gentner, Keith Holyoak, and Boicho Kokinov (eds.) The Analogical Mind: Perspectives from Cognitive Science, Cambridge, MA: The MIT Press, 2001, pp. 499–538.
- Holland, J.H., Holyoak, K.J., Nisbett, R.E., and Thagard, P. (1986). Induction: Processes of Inference, Learning, and Discovery. Cambridge, MA, MIT Press, ISBN 0-262-58096-9.
- Holyoak, K.J., and Thagard, P. (1995). Mental Leaps: Analogy in Creative Thought. Cambridge, MA, MIT Press, ISBN 0-262-58144-2.
- Holyoak, K.J., and Thagard, P. (1997). The Analogical Mind.
- Hummel, J.E., and Holyoak, K.J. (2005). Relational Reasoning in a Neurally Plausible Cognitive Architecture Archived 2021-10-11 at the Wayback Machine
- Itkonen, E. (2005). Analogy as Structure and Process. Amsterdam/Philadelphia: John Benjamins Publishing Company.
- Juthe, A. (2005). "Argument by Analogy", in Argumentation (2005) 19: 1–27.
- Keane, M.T. Ledgeway; Duff, S (1994). "Constraints on analogical mapping: a comparison of three models" (PDF). Cognitive Science. 18 (3): 287–334. doi:10.1016/0364-0213(94)90015-9.
- Keane, M.T. (1997). "What makes an analogy difficult? The effects of order and causal structure in analogical mapping". Journal of Experimental Psychology: Learning, Memory, and Cognition. 123 (4): 946–967. doi:10.1037/0278-7393.23.4.946. PMID 9231438.
- Lamond, G. (2006). Precedent and Analogy in Legal Reasoning, in Stanford Encyclopedia of Philosophy.
- Langacker, Ronald W. (1987). Foundations of Cognitive grammar. Vol. I, Theoretical prerequisites. Stanford: Stanford University Press.
- Little, J (2000). "Analogy in Science: Where Do We Go From Here?". Rhetoric Society Quarterly. 30: 69–92. doi:10.1080/02773940009391170. S2CID 145500740.
- Little, J (2008). "The Role of Analogy in George Gamow's Derivation of Drop Energy". Technical Communication Quarterly. 17 (2): 1–19. doi:10.1080/10572250701878876. S2CID 32910655.
- McArthur, Tom; Lam-McArthur, Jacqueline; Fontaine, Lise, eds. (2018). The Oxford Companion to the English Language (2nd ed.). Oxford: Oxford University Press. doi:10.1093/acref/9780199661282.001.0001. ISBN 978-0-19-966128-2. OCLC 1040511034. OL 30592905M. Wikidata Q135987047.
- Melandri, Enzo. La linea e il circolo. Studio logico-filosofico sull'analogia (1968), Quodlibet, Macerata 2004 prefazione di Giorgio Agamben.
- Morrison, C., and Dietrich, E. (1995). Structure-Mapping vs. High-level Perception.
- Pessali, H.; Dalto, F. and Fernández, R. (2015). Analogies we suffer by: the case of the state as a household. In: Tae-Hee Jo; Zdravka Todorova (Org.). Advancing the Frontiers of Heterodox Economics: Essays in Honor of Frederic S. Lee. Nova Iorque: Routledge, p. 281-295.
- Perelman, Ch, Olbrechts-Tyteca, L. (1969), The New Rhetoric: A Treatise on Argumentation, Notre Dame 1969.
- Ross, J.F., (1982), Portraying Analogy. Cambridge: Cambridge University Press.
- Ross, J.F. (October 1970). "Analogy and The Resolution of Some Cognitivity Problems". The Journal of Philosophy. 67 (20): 725–746. doi:10.2307/2024008. JSTOR 2024008.
- Ross, J.F. (September 1961). "Analogy as a Rule of Meaning for Religious Language". International Philosophical Quarterly. 1 (3): 468–502. doi:10.5840/ipq19611356.
- Ross, J.F., (1958), A Critical Analysis of the Theory of Analogy of St Thomas Aquinas, (Ann Arbor, MI: University Microfilms Inc).
- Shelley, C. (2003). Multiple analogies in Science and Philosophy. Amsterdam/Philadelphia: John Benjamins Publishing Company.
- Turney, P.D.; Littman, M.L. (2005). "Corpus-based learning of analogies and semantic relations". Machine Learning. 60 (1–3): 251–278. arXiv:cs/0508103. doi:10.1007/s10994-005-0913-1. S2CID 9322367.
- Turney, P.D. (2006). "Similarity of semantic relations". Computational Linguistics. 32 (3): 379–416. arXiv:cs/0608100. doi:10.1162/coli.2006.32.3.379. S2CID 2468783.
- Blank, Douglas S. (10 December 1997). Learning to See Analogies: A Connectionist Exploration (PhD thesis). Indiana University.
