= Rex Sean O'Fahey =

Irish historian

Rex Seán O'Fahey (1943 – April 9, 2019) was an Irish historian specializing in Islamic Africa. He was especially known for his work on Sudan and on Sufism.

== Career ==
O'Fahey was brought up partly in Mombasa in Kenya and then in England but always self-identified as Irish, using the Irish middle name Séan rather than Rex for much of his later life. He studied at the School of Oriental and African Studies (SOAS) in London, where he then did a PhD under P. M. Holt, the leading historian of Sudan, on the history of Darfur, a part of Sudan, where he conducted fieldwork between 1969 and 1976. He taught at the University of Khartoum from 1970 to 1973, and after a year at the University of Edinburgh, moved to the University of Bergen, where he spent the rest of his career, first as a research fellow and finally a professor. He retired in 2013. He also taught at Northwestern University in Illinois, where he held an adjunct professorship and cooperated closely with John Hunwick, a Northwestern professor and a fellow Africanist from SOAS, with whom he founded the Brill book series on the Arabic Literature of Africa, and also the journal Sudanic Africa, later renamed Islamic Africa. O'Fahey also helped found the Institute for the Study of Islamic Thought in Africa at Northwestern. He also maintained close relations with the Sudanese National Records Office, whose long-term director, Muhammad Ibrahim Abu Salim, he once described as his "mentor." P. M. Holt, O'Fahey's PhD supervisor, had once directed the Sudan National Archives, the predecessor of the National Records Office.

== Research ==
O'Fahey was one of the first generation of post-colonial scholars to work on African history, which had been somewhat neglected, and his first book, State and Society in Dar Fur (1980, based on his thesis), was one of the first histories of a region the size of France.

His later research moved eastwards towards the central Sudan, and focused on Sufism, a major force in Sudanese life and society. He pioneered the study of the work and influence of the great eighteenth-/nineteenth-century Sufi Aḥmad ibn Idrīs, publishing in 1990 the definitive work on Ibn Idrīs, Enigmatic Saint: Ahmad Ibn Idris and the Idrisi Tradition. In 1993 he published both the book The Letters of Ahmad Ibn Idris (with Einar Thomassen and Bernd Radtke) and the seminal article "Neo-Sufism Reconsidered" (also with Radtke). His work on Sufism and the Sudan was taken further by a number of his PhD students, including Anders Bjørkelo, Ali Salih Karrar, Knut S. Vikør, Endre Stiansen, Albrecht Hofheinz, Anne K. Bang, and Mark Sedgwick. The American historian John O. Voll responded to "Neo-Sufism Reconsidered" in 2008 with his own "Neo-Sufism: Reconsidered Again," and the debate continues.

== Bibliography ==
=== Single author books ===
- “The growth and Development of the Keira Sultanate of Dar Fur” PhD dissertation, SOAS, 1972.
- The Kingdoms of the Sudan (with Jay Spaulding) (London: Methuen, 1974) ISBN 978-0-416-77450-4
- State and Society in Dār Fūr (London: Hurst, 1980) ISBN 0-905838-04-1
- Land in Dār Fūr: Charters and Related Documents from the Dār Fūr Sultanate (Cambridge: Cambridge University Press, 1983) ISBN 978-0-521-24643-9. With Muhammad Ibrahim Abu Salim.
- Arabic Literature in Africa: A Bulletin of Biographical and Bibliographical Information (with John O. Hunwick) (Evanston: Northwestern University Press, 1987).
- Enigmatic Saint: Ahmad ibn Idris and the Idrisi Tradition (London: Hurst, 1990) ISBN 978-1-85065-087-4
- The Exoteric Ahmad Ibn Idris: A Sufi's Critique of the Madhahib and the Wahhabis: Four Arabic Texts with Translation and Commentary (with Bernd Radtke, John O’Kane, and Knut S Vikør (Leiden: Brill, 1999) ISBN 978-90-04-11375-6
- The Darfur Sultanate: A History (New York: Columbia University Press, 2008) ISBN 978-0-231-70038-2
- Darfur and the British: A Sourcebook (London: Hurst & Company, 2016) ISBN 978-1-85065-948-8

=== Edited volumes ===
- The Writings of Eastern Sudanic Africa to c. 1900 (Leiden: Brill, 1994) ISBN 978-90-04-09450-5
- The Writings of the Muslim Peoples of Northeastern Africa (Leiden: Brill, 1995) ISBN 978-90-04-10938-4
