= Nordic Society for Middle Eastern Studies =

The Nordic Society for Middle Eastern Studies is a learned society formed in 1989 that is devoted to the promotion of the academic study of the Middle East in the Nordic region. The NSMES arranges an academic conference on Middle Eastern studies, held every three years in a different Nordic country, initially in Sweden, Denmark, Finland, and Norway. The 2016 conference was hosted by the University of Southern Denmark in Odense, and the 2019 conference was at the University of Helsinki in Helsinki, Finland. After the University of Iceland started a Middle Eastern Studies program in 2015, Iceland joined the other Nordic countries in the NSMES, and the 2022 conference was held in Reykjavik. The current chairperson of the Nordic Society is Mark Sedgwick.
