= Lawrence A. Alexander =

American lawyer and law professor (born 1943)

- Born: September 23, 1943 (age 83); Fort Worth, Texas, U.S.
- Occupation: Law Professor

Academic background
- Education: Williams College (BA); Yale University (LLB)

Academic work
- Institutions: University of San Diego School of Law; University of Pennsylvania Law School; University of Texas School of Law; Hebrew University of Jerusalem
- Main interests: Constitutional Law; Criminal Law; Jurisprudence

Lawrence A. Alexander (born September 23, 1943) is an American legal scholar focusing on constitutional law, criminal law, and jurisprudence. He is the Warren Distinguished Professor at the University of San Diego School of Law. He has also taught at the University of Pennsylvania Law School, the University of Texas School of Law, and the Hebrew University of Jerusalem.

== Life and career ==
Alexander was born in Fort Worth, Texas. He received a BA in Philosophy in 1965 from Williams College, and an LLB in 1968 from Yale University.

In an August 2017 piece in The Philadelphia Inquirer entitled “Paying the price for breakdown of the country’s bourgeois culture,” Alexander wrote with Amy Wax, the Robert Mundheim Professor of Law at the University of Pennsylvania Law School that the decline of “bourgeois values” since the 1950s has contributed to social ills as male labor-force-participation rates are down to Depression-era levels, opioid abuse is epidemic, half of all children are born to single mothers, and many college students lack basic skills, asserting that "all cultures are not equal".

He is the author of Is There a Right of Freedom of Expression? (Cambridge University Press, 2005). With Emily Sherwin, he is the author of The Rule of Rules: Morality, Rules & the Dilemmas of Law (Duke University Press, 2001) and Demystifying Legal Reasoning (Cambridge University Press, 2008). He has written over 170 scholarly articles.
