= Logic (disambiguation) =

Logic is the study of the principles and criteria of valid inference and demonstration.

Logic may also refer to:

- Mathematical logic, a branch of mathematics that grew out of symbolic logic
- Philosophical logic, the application of formal logic to philosophical problems
- Logic programming, rule-based computer programming paradigm based on formal logic

== Art, entertainment, and the media ==
- "Logic" (song), by Operator Please, 2010
- Logic, a 1981 album by Hideki Matsutake's Logic System
- Mr Logic, a character in a Viz magazine comic strip
- Logic (poem) by Ringelnatz
- The Logic, a Canadian news website

== People ==
- Logic (rapper) (born 1990), American rapper
- Logic, member of hip hop group Y'all So Stupid
- DJ Logic (born 1972), American turntablist
- Lamont "Logic" Coleman, producer of two tracks on Jim Jones's 2011 album, Capo
- Lora Logic (born 1960), British saxophonist and singer
- Louis Logic, American underground hip-hop emcee
- Samantha Logic (born 1992), American basketball player

== Science and technology ==
- Business logic, program portion encoding the rules determining data processing
- Digital logic, a class of digital circuits characterized by the technology underlying its logic gates
- Logic (electronic cigarette), an electronic cigarette brand owned by Japan Tobacco International
- Relocating logic, embedded information in programs for relocation
- Logically, a startup known for its software, which utilizes artificial intelligence to label textual or visual media as real or fake.

== Software ==
- Dolby Pro Logic, also known as Pro Logic, a surround sound processing technology
- Logic Pro, a MIDI sequencer and Digital Audio Workstation application, part of Logic Studio
- Logic Studio, a music production suite by Apple Inc.

== See also ==
- Logarithm
- Logik (disambiguation)
- Logistic (disambiguation)
- School of Names
