= Mark Sedgwick =

British historian

Mark J. Sedgwick (born 20 July 1960) is a British historian of Islam. He is Full Professor of Arab and Islamic Studies at Aarhus University in Denmark. Sedgwick is notable for pioneering historical research into the religious movement called Traditionalism.

== Life and career ==
=== Early life and education ===
Sedgwick was born in London, England. He was educated in England at Harrow School, where he first became interested in history, and Worcester College, Oxford. He did his PhD in Norway at the University of Bergen under the supervision of Séan O'Fahey.

=== Encounter with Sufism and Traditionalism ===
While living in Cairo in 1990, Sedgwick encountered Sufis from both the Naqshbandiyya tariqa and the Traditionalist Maryamiyya. While not joining either group, he started research on Traditionalism in 1996.

Sedgwick has been accused of "an undisclosed personal history with Traditionalism" and, therefore, of having "a personal and undisclosed bias against Traditionalism". He has also been accused of being a secret Traditionalist Sufi and part of a conspiracy against Enlightenment values. He has pointed out that both charges can hardly be true at the same time and explained that his personal history with Traditionalism was early and limited. He claims this did not result in any bias one way or the other.

=== Career ===
Sedgwick first taught history at the American University in Cairo, Egypt, where he established one of the Arab world's few courses on the history of Zionism. In 2007 he moved to Aarhus University, Denmark, where he became Professor of Arab and Islamic Studies. His books have been translated into French, German, Italian, Spanish, Russian, Romanian, Serbian, Portuguese, Persian, and Turkish. He was a founder member of the European Society for the Study of Western Esotericism, of which he was Secretary 2010–16. He was elected to the board of the Nordic Society for Middle Eastern Studies in 2016, and was elected chairperson in 2019. In 2016 he was a founding member, and first president, of the European Network for the Study of Islam and Esotericism.

=== Work ===
Sedgwick's earliest research was on Sufism in the Arab and Muslim world. He is best known for his work on Sufism and Traditionalism, especially for his Against the Modern World: Traditionalism and the Secret Intellectual History of the Twentieth Century (2004). He is also known for his work on terrorism, especially for his 2004 article "Al-Qaeda and the nature of religious terrorism" in which he argues for understanding the terrorism of Al-Qaeda should be understood in political rather than religious terms. He is a critic of the concept of radicalisation, which he argues is a "source of confusion." Despite his association with the European Society for the Study of Western Esotericism, he has argued that understanding Western esotericism as distinctly Western may no longer be appropriate.

== Works ==
As author

- Sufism: The Essentials. Cairo: American University in Cairo Press, 2000.
- Against the Modern World: Traditionalism and the Secret Intellectual History of the Twentieth Century. Oxford University Press, 2004.
- "Al-Qaeda and the Nature of Religious Terrorism" Terrorism and Political Violence 2004
- Saints and Sons: The Making and Remaking of the Rashidi Ahmadi Sufi Order, 1799–2000. Brill, 2005.
- Islam and Muslims: A Guide to Diverse Experience in a Modern World. Boston: Intercultural Press, 2006.
- Muhammad Abduh. Oxford: Oneworld, 2009.
- “The Concept of Radicalization as a Source of Confusion.” Terrorism and Political Violence 2010
- Western Sufism: From the Abbasids to the New Age. New York: Oxford University Press, 2016.
- Traditionalism: The Radical Project for Restoring Sacred Order. New York: Oxford University Press, 2023.
- New Religious Movements in Islam. Cambridge: Cambridge University Press, 2026.

As editor

- Islamic Myths and Memories: Mediators of Globalization. Editor, with Ulrika Mårtensson and Itzchak Weismann. Farnham: Ashgate Press, 2014.
- Making European Muslims: Religious Socialization among Young Muslims in Scandinavia and Western Europe. Editor. New York: Routledge, 2014.
- Key Thinkers of the Radical Right: Behind the New Threat to Liberal Democracy. Editor. New York: Oxford University Press, 2019.
- Global Sufism: Boundaries, Structures, and Politics. Editor, with Francesco Piraino. London: Hurst, 2019.
- Esoteric Transfers and Constructions: Judaism, Christianity, and Islam. Editor, with Francesco Piraino. New York: Palgrave, 2021.
- Anarchist, Artist, Sufi: The Politics, Painting, and Esotericism of Ivan Aguéli. Editor. London: Bloomsbury, 2021.
