= Amy Wax =

American professor of law (born 1953)

- Wax in 2024
- Born: Amy Laura Wax; January 19, 1953 (age 73); Troy, New York, U.S.
- Occupation: Law professor
- Spouse: Roger Cohen
- Awards: Lindback Award (2015)

Academic background
- Education: Yale University (BS); Somerville College, Oxford (MPhil); Harvard University (MD); Columbia University (JD)

Academic work
- Discipline: Social welfare Civil procedure Poverty law
- Institutions: University of Virginia; University of Pennsylvania

Amy Laura Wax (born January 19, 1953) is an American legal scholar and neurologist. She is a tenured professor at the University of Pennsylvania Law School. Her work addresses issues in social welfare law and policy, as well as the relationship of the family, the workplace, and labor markets. Her remarks on race have attracted controversy, with some calling them white supremacist or racist and others disputing those characterizations.

== Early life ==
Wax was raised with two sisters in an observant Conservative Jewish family in Troy, New York, where she attended public schools. Her father worked in the garment industry, and her mother was a teacher and a government administrator in Albany, New York.

Wax attended Troy High School, where she was head of the school's senior honor roll, graduated as class valedictorian in 1971, and attained the highest score in Rensselaer County in the New York Regents Examinations.

== Education ==
After high school, Wax graduated from Yale University with a Bachelor of Science (BS) in molecular biophysics and biochemistry, summa cum laude, in 1975. She then was awarded a Marshall Scholarship to pursue graduate studies at the University of Oxford. She graduated from Somerville College, Oxford, in 1976 with a Master of Philosophy (MPhil) in philosophy, physiology, and psychology.

Upon returning to the United States, Wax dual enrolled in Harvard Medical School and Harvard Law School. While studying as a medical student, she was a resident tutor in both medicine and philosophy at Eliot House within Harvard College. She earned her Doctor of Medicine (MD), cum laude, with distinction in neuroscience from Harvard Medical School in 1981. Concurrently, Wax was a first year student at Harvard Law from 1980 to 1981.

Wax practiced medicine from 1982 to 1987, doing a residency in neurology at the New York Hospital-Cornell Medical Center and working as a consulting neurologist at a clinic in The Bronx and for a medical group in Brooklyn. She completed her legal education at Columbia Law School, where she became an editor of the Columbia Law Review and was a Harlan Fiske Stone Scholar. She worked part-time to pay for her law school education, obtaining her Juris Doctor (JD) degree in 1987. During her time as a law student at Columbia, Wax received two awards: the Emil Schlesinger Labor Law Prize and the Milton V. Conford Prize in Jurisprudence.

== Career ==
Following graduation, Wax clerked for Judge Abner J. Mikva of the U.S. Court of Appeals for the District of Columbia Circuit from 1987 to 1988. She was admitted to the New York State bar in 1988. Wax then worked in the Office of the Solicitor General of the United States from 1988 to 1994. During her tenure in the office, she argued 15 cases before the U.S. Supreme Court. Wax became an associate professor at the University of Virginia School of Law in 1994, becoming a full professor in 1999.

In July 2001, Wax became a professor at the University of Pennsylvania Law School, receiving the university's appointment as the Robert Mundheim Professor of Law in May 2007. She received both the A. Leo Levin Award for Excellence in an Introductory Course, and the Harvey Levin Memorial Award for Teaching Excellence. In 2015, she received a Lindback Award for Distinguished Teaching, making her one of three Penn Law professors to have received the award in 20 years.

Her academic focus is on social welfare law and policy, and the relationship of the family, the workplace, and labor markets. Wax authored Race, Wrongs, and Remedies: Group Justice in the 21st Century (2009).

=== 2024 sanctions and litigation ===
In September 2024, the University of Pennsylvania suspended Wax for one year at half pay, and removed her named chair. In addition to a public reprimand, the university required that Wax must henceforth state that she "is not speaking for or as a member of the Penn Carey Law School or Penn" at public appearances. She retained her tenure.

In January 2025, Wax filed a suit against the University of Pennsylvania in the U.S. District Court for the Eastern District of Pennsylvania, seeking to remove all punishments and damages for lost wages and harm to her reputation. Wax alleged that Penn had a racially discriminatory speech policy, being more permissive of antisemitic speech while punishing Wax's speech, which Wax described as "discussing race in ways that Penn finds unacceptable". On August 27, 2025, Senior Judge Timothy J. Savage ruled against Wax, dismissing her suit. Wax appealed and filed a second suit alleging violations of academic freedom.

== Statements and reactions ==
=== 2017 and 2019 about African Americans and race ===
In an August 2017 piece in The Philadelphia Inquirer titled "Paying the price for breakdown of the country's bourgeois culture", she wrote with San Diego law professor Larry Alexander that since the 1950s, the decline of "bourgeois values" (such as hard work, self-discipline, marriage, and respect for authority) had contributed to social ills such as male labor force participation rates down to Great Depression-era levels, endemic opioid abuse, half of all children being born to single mothers, and many college students lacking basic skills. The authors asserted that "all cultures are not equal. Or at least they are not equal in preparing people to be productive in an advanced economy." She told The Daily Pennsylvanian that "everyone wants to go to countries ruled by white Europeans" because of their "superior" mores. In the same interview, Wax stated that she did not believe in the superiority of one race over another, but was describing the situation in various countries and cultures.

In a September 2017 podcast interview with Professor Glenn Loury, Wax said: "Take Penn Law School, or some top 10 law school... Here's a very inconvenient fact... I don't think I've ever seen a black student graduate in the top quarter of the class, and rarely, rarely in the top half ... I can think of one or two students who scored in the top half in my required first-year course," and said that Penn Law has a racial diversity mandate for its law review. University of Pennsylvania Law School Dean Theodore Ruger responded, "Black students have graduated in the top of the class at Penn Law, and the Law Review does not have a diversity mandate. Rather, its editors are selected based on a competitive process."

In July 2019, at the Edmund Burke Foundation's inaugural National Conservatism Conference, Wax said, "Embracing... cultural distance nationalism, means in effect taking the position that our country will be better off with more whites and fewer non-whites."

An August 2017 petition seeking to fire Wax gathered about 4,000 signatures. That same month, 33 of her fellow Penn Law faculty members signed an open letter condemning statements Wax made in her Philadelphia Inquirer piece and Daily Pennsylvanian interview. The Penn Law chapter of the National Lawyers Guild condemned her comments. Asa Khalif, a leader of Black Lives Matter Pennsylvania, demanded that Wax be fired. Khalif said that he had notified the university that, if Wax were not fired within a week, he would begin disrupting university classes and other activities with a series of protests.

As a result of these controversies, in March 2018, Dean Ruger stripped Wax of her duties teaching curriculum courses to first-year students. He condemned her comments as "repugnant," and, at a student town hall meeting, he said that "her presence here ... makes me angry" but that "the only way to get rid of a tenured professor is this process... that's gonna take months."

Commentator Mona Charen said that the op-ed on bourgeois values "contained not a particle of racism" and that "if the Left cannot distinguish reasoned academic arguments from vile racist insinuations, it will strengthen the very extremists it fears." In a Wall Street Journal op-ed, political commentator Heather Mac Donald criticized the "hysterical response" to Wax's piece. The New Criterion wrote: "Dean Ruger may wish to consult a study published in the Stanford Law Review in 2004 which showed that in the most elite law schools ... only 8 percent of first-year black students were in the top half of their class." Robert VerBruggen, deputy managing editor of the National Review, cited papers he said supported Wax's claims and wrote, "If Penn Law is different, or if things have changed in recent years, let's see some numbers."

University of Pennsylvania Law School Overseer Paul Levy resigned to protest what he termed Wax's "shameful treatment". Levy wrote in his letter of resignation: "Preventing Wax from teaching first-year students doesn't right academic or social wrongs. Rather, you are suppressing what is crucial to the liberal educational project: open, robust and critical debate over differing views of important social issues." Jonathan Zimmerman, who teaches education and history at Penn, wrote: "I think a lot of what Amy Wax says is wrong. But ... I also think it's my duty to defend her right to say it, and to plead for a more honest and fair debate about it... we should want everyone to hear what she says, so that they can come to their own educated conclusions."

=== 2021 and 2022 remarks on Asians, African Americans and other minorities ===
In 2021, Wax wrote that "As long as most Asians support Democrats and help to advance their positions, I think the United States is better off with fewer Asians and less Asian immigration." She claimed that Asians are ungrateful for the advantages of living in the US and vote disproportionately for the "pernicious" Democratic Party, which she called "mystifying" because the Democratic Party "demands equal outcomes despite clear . . . group differences" and "valorizes blacks." She cited Enoch Powell while calling for stricter race-based immigration restrictions against Asians.

During a January 2022 interview with Gad Saad, Wax stated that among her past students "there were some very smart Jews", but "Ashkenazi Jews are 'diluting [their] brand like crazy because [they are] intermarrying.'"

In April 2022, Wax said on Tucker Carlson Today that "blacks" and other "non-Western" groups harbor "resentment, shame, and envy" against Western people for their "outsized achievements and contributions." Wax then attacked Indian immigrants for criticizing things in the United States when "their country is a shithole" and went on to say that "the role of envy and shame in the way that the Third-World regards the First-World [...] creates ingratitude of the most monstrous kind."

Wax's syllabus for her seminar "Conservative Political and Legal Thought" that was released in August 2022 included a scheduled speech by white supremacist Jared Taylor, the editor of the white supremacist magazine American Renaissance.

Penn Law School's dean, Theodore Ruger, called Wax's statements about Asians "racist", "white supremacist", and "diametrically opposed to the policies and ethos of this institution". Glenn Loury, the Brown University professor who had hosted the interview, called her comments "outrageous" and said, "What she said about the Asians could have been said, and was said, about the Jews not so long ago. Today we call that antisemitism." As of January 5, 2022, nearly 9,000 law students had signed a petition to have Wax suspended. The statements drew condemnation from both local Pennsylvania papers and national press.

Wax's comments drew heavy criticism by the Indian-American community, including Penn Law faculty Neil Makhija and U.S. Congressman Raja Krishnamoorthi, who called these comments irresponsible and said, "Such comments create hatred and fear, and cause real harm to minority communities." Jay Caspian Kang of the New York Times "a provocateur who spews racist ideas."

== Awards and honors ==
- While attending Columbia Law School, Wax was honored with the Emil Schlesinger Labor Law Prize.
- While at Columbia she also was bestowed with the Milton V. Conford Prize in Jurisprudence.
- In 2005, the University of Pennsylvania awarded her the A. Leo Levin Award for Excellence in an Introductory Course.
- In 2015, Penn bestowed upon Wax the Lindback Award for Distinguished Teaching.

== Bibliography ==
- Race, Wrongs, and Remedies: Group Justice in the 21st Century, 2009, Rowman & Littlefield Publishers, ISBN 978-0742562868
