= Logik =

Logik may refer to:

- LoGIK, the GIK Institute Clock Tower in Topi, Pakistan
- Logik, an electronics brand of Currys plc, originally of Dixons Retail
- Logik (poem)

== See also ==
- Logic (disambiguation)
