= Constitutio Criminalis Theresiana =

1768 penal code in Austria and Bohemia

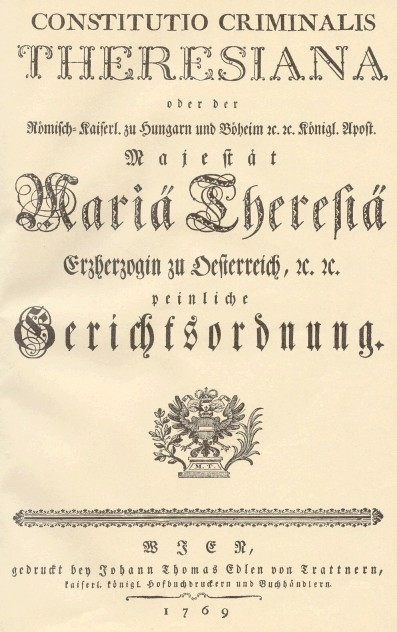
Front page of the Constitutio Criminalis Theresiana

The Constitutio Criminalis Theresiana (also Nemesis Theresiana or just Theresiana) was a penal code issued in 1768 by the Austrian ruler Maria Theresa (1717 – 1780). The penal code established a unified criminal law and criminal procedure law in the Habsburg-ruled countries of Austria and Bohemia. In Hungary, Belgium and Lombardy, however, the law did not apply.

The new penal code substantially restricted the use of torture as authorized by the old code, although torture was only totally abolished in 1776. When the code was issued, the jurist and thinker Joseph von Sonnenfels criticized the continued use of torture and capital punishment. Maria Theresa allowed him to exercise his academic freedom in this case, even if she sided against the jurist in another instance.

Capital punishment would be abolished by the Constitutio Criminalis Josephina under Joseph II in 1787 (he had stopped using the punishment in practice since 1781 though).
