= Logistic =

Logistic may refer to:

== Mathematics ==
- Logistic function, a sigmoid function used in many fields
  - Logistic map, a recurrence relation that sometimes exhibits chaos
  - Logistic regression, a statistical model using the logistic function
  - Logit, the inverse of the logistic function
  - Logistic distribution, the derivative of the logistic function, a continuous probability distribution, used in probability theory and statistics
- Mathematical logic, subfield of mathematics exploring the applications of formal logic to mathematics

== Other uses ==
- Logistics, the management of resources and their distributions
  - Logistic engineering, the scientific study of logistics
  - Military logistics, the study of logistics at the service of military units and operations

== See also ==
- Logic (disambiguation)
