= Robert Mundheim =

American attorney and law professor (born 1933)

Robert Mundheim BVO
- Born: February 24, 1933 (age 93); Hamburg, Germany
- Education: Harvard University (AB, LLB)
- Occupations: Attorney and academician
- Spouse: Guna Smitchens Mundheim
- Children: 2
- Parent(s): Alfred and Cecile (Cohen) Mundheim
- Awards: Order of Merit of the Federal Republic of Germany (2007)

Robert Harry Mundheim BVO (born February 24, 1933) is an American legal scholar. He is the former Dean of the University of Pennsylvania Law School, General Counsel of the U.S. Treasury Department, Co-Chairman of the law firm Fried, Frank, Harris, Shriver & Jacobson, General Counsel of Salomon, Inc., and Fred Carr Professor of Law and Financial Institutions at the University of Pennsylvania Law School. He was honored by the American Lawyer in 2014 as a "Lifetime Achiever." The University of Pennsylvania Law School has an endowed chair named after him, "the Robert Mundheim Professor of Law."

== Early life and education ==
Mundheim was born in Hamburg, Germany, to Alfred and Cecile (Cohn) Mundheim, and emigrated to the United States with his mother and brother in January 1939. He earned his B.A., magna cum laude, from Harvard College in 1954, and a LL.B., magna cum laude, from Harvard Law School in 1957. From 1961 to 1962 he was in the US Air Force and served in Berlin.

== Legal career ==
After admission to the New York bar in 1958, Mundheim practiced at the law firm Shearman & Sterling until 1961. From 1962-63, he was special counsel to the Securities and Exchange Commission.

Mundheim then entered academia, with one stint of simultaneous government service. His first academic posts were brief: visiting professor at Duke Law School in 1964, professor of law at the University of Pennsylvania from 1965 to 1970, and visiting professor at Harvard Law School from 1968 to 1969. During his 1970-80 tenure as Fred Carr Professor of Law and Financial Institutions at the University of Pennsylvania Law School, he became, in 1970, the youngest professor in the law school's history to be named an academic chair and served three of those years as general counsel of the U.S. Treasury Department (1977–80). In 1980, the University of Pennsylvania Law School named him University Professor of Law and Finance, a position he occupied until 1992. From 1982 to 1989, he was also dean.

Mundheim became co-chairman of the law firm Fried, Frank, Harris, Shriver & Jacobson in 1992, but he soon left for Salomon, Inc., where he worked as general counsel from 1992 to 1997 and shifted to the same role for Salomon Smith Barney Holdings from 1997 to 1998.

In 1999, he began work again at Shearman & Sterling, the law firm where he started his career. He is now Of Counsel there as well as a law professor at the James E. Rogers College of Law at the University of Arizona.

== Service and honors ==
From 1994-2000, Mundheim remained connected to the University of Pennsylvania Law School through service as a board member and overseer. The law school has established an endowed chair in his honor, the Robert Mundheim Professor of Law, currently held by Amy Wax. The university awarded him an honorary M.A. in 1971.

Mundheim is on the board of trustees for both the Curtis Institute of Music and the American College of Governance Counsel, an American honorary association of lawyers widely recognized for their achievements in the field of governance. He has served as a director of Commerce Clearing House, Inc. (1980-1996), First Pennsylvania Bank (1980-1990), CoreStates Bank N.A. (1990-1992), Benjamin Moore & Co. (1997-2001), eCollege, Inc. (2000-2007), and Hypo Real Estate. Other institutions where he has had a prominent role include the Salzburg Seminar (board of directors, 1999-2002 and now), the American Academy in Berlin (president, 2000-2006), and the National Association of Securities Dealers (vice-chairman, governor-at-large, and member of the executive committee, 1988-1991).

Mundheim was awarded the Officer’s Cross of the Order of Merit of the Federal Republic of Germany in 2007. In 2014, in The Monetary System: Analysis and New Approaches to Regulation, authors Jean-François Serval and Jean-Pascal Tranié noted: "This year, Robert Mundheim was honored by the American Lawyer as a 'Lifetime Achiever', which is one of the most recognized distinctions that an American lawyer can get." He received a Doctor of Humane Letters degree from The New School in 2019.

Preceded by James O. Freedman	Dean of the University of Pennsylvania Law School; 1982–1989	Succeeded by Colin Diver
