= Analog ear =

An analog ear or analog cochlea is a model of the ear or of the cochlea (in the inner ear) based on an electrical, electronic or mechanical analog. An analog ear is commonly described as an interconnection of electrical elements such as resistors, capacitors, and inductors; sometimes transformers and active amplifiers are included. These models are created for research purposes.

== Ear structure ==
Anatomy of the human ear. (The length of the auditory canal is exaggerated for viewing purposes.) Brown is outer ear. Red is middle ear. Purple is inner ear.

The ear of the typical mammal consists of three parts. The outer ear collects sounds like a horn and guides them to the eardrum. Vibrations of the drum are conveyed to the inner ear via a system of bones called ossicles. These leverage the larger motions of the eardrum to the smaller vibrations of the oval window. This window connects to the cochlea which is a long dual channel arrangement consisting of two channels separated by the basilar membrane. The structure, about 36 mm in length, is coiled to conserve space. The oval window introduces sounds to the upper channel. The lower channel has a round window but this is not driven by the bones of the middle ear. The far end of the structure has a hole between the two channels called the helicotrema that equalizes slowly varying pressures in the two channels. A series of sensory hair cells along the basilar membrane respond to send neural pulses towards the brain.

== Ear modeling ==
Models for the ear of a direct kind have been created, most notably by Nobel Laureate Georg von Békésy. He used glass slides, razor blades, and an elastic membrane to represent the helicotrema. He could measure vibrations along the basilar membrane in response to different excitations frequencies. He found that the pattern of displacements for given frequency sine wave along the basilar membrane rose somewhat gradually to a peak and thereafter fell. High frequencies favored shorter distances from the oval window than did lower ones. Frequency values approximate a logarithmic distribution with distance. (Note: Detailed discussions of the direct models by von Békésy will be found in his book, "Experiments in Hearing". Also see his article and others in S. S. Stevens, "Handbook of Experimental Psychology". This handbook is singled out as a major source of information on speech and hearing, word recognition, and other topics as well as data on the human ear.)

== Mechanical and electrical analogs ==
Early mechanical and electrical analog ears were recounted in the 1954 book Analog Methods in Computation and Simulation:

...Barton and Browning also simulated the characteristics of hearing over the range of an octave by making use of 13 pendulum resonators. A modern theory of the dynamics of the cochlea, accounting for the hydrodynamics of the cochlear ducts and the dynamics of the basilar membrane, has been proposed and an electrical analogy developed to check the theory. The "analog ear" is a transmission line made up of 175 section s, each section consisting of 2 inductances (to represent the mass of a slice of fluid and that of the duct) and 4 condensers (to represent duct stiffness).

— Walter W. Soroka

A direct (mechanical) model uses the variables of air and water pressure, fluid velocity and viscosity, and displacement. An electrical analog model uses a different set of variables, namely, voltage and current. The outer and middle parts of the ear can be represented with a collection of coils, capacitors, and an ideal transformer to represent the leveraging effect of the ossicles. This circuit terminates with a capacitor representing the oval window. From there, the two channels are represented with a sequence of inductors and resistors for fluid flow within each channel with the two channels joined with a sequence of series resonant RLC circuits. Voltages across capacitances represent basilar membrane displacements. Element values along the cochlea are tapered in a logarithmic fashion to represent lowering frequency responses with distance.

The pattern of voltages along the basilar membrane can be viewed on an oscilloscope. Average values can be obtained with rectification and shown as patterns using a high speed commutator. The analog ear shows patterns that closely follow those observed by Georg von Békésy on his more direct model.

The first relatively complete model was constructed in the early 1960s at the University of Arizona by two graduate students and their faculty mentor with support from the newly established Air Force Bionics program. This work was first summarized in a report: "An Electronic Analog of the Ear", Technical Documentary Report No. AMRL-TDR-1963-60, June 1963, Biophysics Laboratory, 6570-th Aerospace Medical Research Laboratories, Aerospace Medical Division, Air Force Systems Command, by E. Glaesser, W. F. Caldwell, and J. L. Stewart. The report contains an extensive list of references. The work was also reported at Bionics symposia.

== John L. Stewart and Covox ==
Unlike models based on a series of active filters or represented with digital equations, an analog ear can incorporate nonlinearities that represent nonlinear actions of the basilar membrane, perhaps caused by asymmetric motions of sensory cells resulting in asymmetric motions of the basilar membrane. Difference frequencies could be generated as are observed in the human. Some difference frequencies originating in the cochlea can be observed in the outer ear.

Neural signals responding to motions of the basilar membrane show responses in one direction as in rectification. At all but low frequencies, the neural measure averages over multiple cycles to give the equivalent of rectification followed by averaging (low-pass filtering). Over the entire cochlea, response shows as a pattern that varies more slowly that the applied frequency but that does follow the envelope of the applied signal. Each group of cells can give rise to a semi-periodic wave that can be analyzed by neurons in the brain. The total pattern that arises from a sound can thus be thought of as a two-dimensional pattern in time with one axis being the distance along the basilar membrane and the other being distance along some sequence of neurons. These patterns, varying at rates less than lower audio frequencies, have shapes that can be identified much like patterns in vision. The concept of the "neural analyzer" as an extension of cochlear patterns is discussed in U.S. patent 3,387,093, "Speech Bandwidth Compression System", June 4, 1968 (filed in 1964).

It was found that the analog ear with its asymmetric overlapping bands was more reliable in identifying speech sounds than is a conventional frequency spectrum. The second formant is the most significant single measure. Speech sounds of interest include whispered and clipped speech. (Note: See "Speech Processing with A Cochlear-Neural Analog, John L. Stewart. An article published in the journal Behavioral Science studied constraints to sensory discrimination imposed by two kinds of neural noise. Considerable information on speech patterns and recognition is reported by a number of different authors in the Handbook of Experimental Psychology referred to above.)

Applications were made to animals and insects with appropriate ear models. Another study using the analog ear was "Simulating Mechanisms in Animal Echoranging", John L. Stewart and James M. Kasson.

Many reports, articles, and patents followed the research as cited in the reports listed here. The last full report employed a relatively early version of a computer program written in time-shared BASIC. (Note: See "A Theory and Physical Model for Cochlear Mechanics", John L. Stewart. Parameters of the analog ear and patterns obtained with the computer program are shown. Patterns and parameters given in this report are sufficient to reproduce analog ears.)

Stewart also self-published several books, doing business as Santa Rita Technology, and later as Covox, including The Analog Ear Story and The Analog Ear–brain System in 1964, and The Bionic Ear in 1979.

The research resulting from analog ear studies fueled the creation of special sounds for use in repelling birds and other pests. Sounds were synthesized to follow natural bird calls but were of a switching kind. The concept is similar to the use of a babble of human voices for jamming another person's communications. The "Av-Alarm" was the principal product. It was also adapted to the transonic and ultrasonic regions with a device called "Transonic".

The research also led to development of an early speech word recognizer that operated with 8-bit computers as well as later ones based on 16-bit processors. The product line was developed by Covox, Inc. with product names of "Speech Thing" and "Voice Master".

A number of U.S. (and foreign) patents on topics related to Stewart's analog ear were granted. In the order of filing dates starting in 1962, numbers are U.S. patent 3,294,909, U.S. patent 3,325,597, U.S. patent 3,387,093, U.S. patent 3,432,618, U.S. patent 3,378,700, U.S. patent 3,483,325, U.S. patent 3,459,034, U.S. patent 3,543,138, and U.S. patent 3,510,588.

== Analog VLSI cochlea models ==
Several groups have built analog VLSI hearing chips in recent decades.
