= Argumentum e contrario =

In logic, an argumentum e contrario (Latin: 'argument from the contrary'; also a contrario or ex contrario), also known as appeal from the contrary, denotes any proposition that is argued to be correct because it is not disproven by a certain case. It is the opposite of the analogy. When analogy is allowed, e contrario is forbidden and vice versa. Arguments e contrario are often used in the legal system as a way to solve problems not currently covered by a certain system of laws. Although it might be used as a logical fallacy, arguments e contrario are not by definition fallacies.

In law, the use of the argumentum e contrario finds its footing in the Latin maxim: ubicumque lex voluit dixit, ubi tacuit noluit that runs as follows: If the Legislator wished to say something, he would do that expressly.

== Legal examples ==
- "§ 123 of the X-Law says that green cars need to have blue tires. Therefore, red cars don't have to have blue tires."

Here the argument is based on the fact that red cars are not green cars and therefore § 123 of the X-Law cannot be applied to them. This requires the law to be interpreted to determine which solution would have been desired if the lawmaker had considered red cars. In this case it is probably safe to assume that they only wanted to regulate green cars and not cars of other colors.

On the other hand, this example:

- "§ 456 of the Y-Law says that it's irrelevant whether a message is sent by letter or by telegraph. Therefore, messages cannot be sent by fax machines."

As with the example above, the argument is based on the fact that the law does not mention something (in this case, faxes), but leaps to the interpretation that they must therefore not be used. Here, the belief that lawmakers intentionally excluded fax machines is less reasonable than the assumption that fax machines did not exist at this time and that, were the law passed today, they would have been mentioned. Here the e contrario argument is used fallaciously in two ways: it places the letter of the law above its intent, and mistakes a time, place, and manner law regulating letters and telegraphs, for a law only authorizing letters and telegraphs, which is it not.

Novel legal cases often hinge on more cogent arguments of the form:

- "§§ 455–457 of the Y-Law specifically cover messages sent by letter or by telegraph, and do not mention fax machines or electronic mail, and thus cannot be held to apply to either of the latter."

Depending upon the intent and scope of the law, it may be held by the court to apply to the previously unaccounted-for situation by analogy, or to not apply because the cases are insufficiently analogous, such that a legislative change to the law's wording would be required for such an expansion of scope. Cases raising such questions are increasingly common as technology introduces capabilities that are somewhat but not exactly analogous to those provided by older technologies. A high-profile example of the use of argumentum e contrario (rejected by the court) in such a case is Steve Jackson Games, Inc. v. United States Secret Service.

== See also ==
- Analogy
- A minore ad maius
- A maiore ad minus
