= General Penal Code (Iceland) =

The Legislature
- Long title: GPC governs the criminal law of Iceland
- Territorial extent: Iceland
- Enacted by: The Legislature
- Enacted: 12 February 1940
- Status: In force

General Penal Code (Icelandic: Almenn hegningarlög) governs the criminal law in Iceland. The code is passed under Act no.19 and revised acts have been adopted in principal areas of law, such as the Act on Customs and the Act in Respect of Children. In the last few years, legislation is updated in certain fields of law, such as in banking, communications, corporations and intellectual property rights.

== Structure ==
General Penal Code of 1940, sub-divided into 29 chapters, comprises 269 articles.

Chapters	Articles	Description
Chapter I	1 - 11	Conditions for Authority of Penalties, Sphere of Application of Penal Law ? 1)et al.
Chapter II	12 - 19	General Conditions for Imposition of Penalties
Chapter III	20 - 23	Attempt and Participation
Chapter IV	24 - 30	Rules of Indictment
Chapter V	31 - 55	On the Penalties
Chapter VI	56 - 61	On Conditionally Suspended Indictment and Suspended Sentences
Chapter VII	62 - 69	On Security Measures, Deprivation of Civil Rights and Confiscation of Assets
Chapter VIII	70 - 79	Factors Influencing Determination of Penalty
Chapter IX	80 - 85	Limitations of Criminal Liability, Cancellation of Sanctions and Restoration of Civil Rights.
Chapter X	86 - 97	High Treason
Chapter XI	98 - 105	Offences against the Constitution of the State and its Supreme Administration
Chapter XII	106 - 117	Offences against the Authorities
Chapter XIII	118 - 127	Offences against Public Peace and General Order
Chapter XIV	128 - 141	Offences while Exercising a Public Office
Chapter XV	142 - 149	False Testimony and False Accusations
Chapter XVI	150 - 154	Counterfeit of Money and other Offences respecting Legal Tender
Chapter XVII	155 - 163	Falsification of Documents and other Offences pertaining to Visible Evidence
Chapter XVIII	164 - 175	Offences Causing Danger to the Public
Chapter XIX	176 - 179	Miscellaneous Offences against Public Interests
Chapter XX	180 - 187	Violations of Rules respecting Maintenance and Employment Practice
Chapter XXI	188 - 193	Offences against Family Relationships
Chapter XXII	194 - 210	Sexual Offences
Chapter XXIII	211 - 224	Manslaughter and Bodily Injuries
Chapter XXIV	225 - 227	Offences against Personal Freedom
Chapter XXV	228 - 242	Defamations and Offences against the Inviolability of Private Life
Chapter XXVI	243 - 256	Enrichment Offences
Chapter XXVII	257 - 264	Miscellaneous Offences pertaining to Financial Rights
Chapter XXVIII	265 - 267	Provisions on Compensation, Cancellation of Inheritance Right et al.
Chapter XXIX	NA	NA
