= Emily Sherwin =

American legal scholar

Emily L. Sherwin is the Frank B. Ingersoll Professor of Law at the Cornell Law School. At Cornell, her specialties include "jurisprudence, property, and remedies".

Sherwin did her undergraduate studies at Lake Forest College in Illinois, graduating in 1977. She earned her J.D. from the Boston University School of Law in 1981. She also has a master's degree in philosophy, earned in 2015 from the Sage School of Philosophy at Cornell University.

From 1981 to 1982, Sherwin clerked for Massachusetts Supreme Judicial Court chief justice Edward F. Hennessey. After practicing law for three years in Boston, she taught in the University of Kentucky College of Law from 1985 to 1990, and in the University of San Diego School of Law from 1990 to 2003, before moving to Cornell in 2003. She was named the Ingersoll Professor in 2014.

With Theodore Eisenberg, she is the author of the casebook Ames, Chafee, and Re on Remedies: Cases and Materials. With Lawrence A. Alexander, she is the author of two books The Rule of Rules: Morality, Rules & the Dilemmas of Law (Duke University Press, 2001) and Demystifying Legal Reasoning (Cambridge University Press, 2008).
