= Bismar Siregar =

Indonesian judge (1928–2012)

Bismar Siregar (15 September 1928 in Sipirok, South Tapanuli, North Sumatra – 19 April 2012 in Jakarta) was a former Judge Supreme Supreme Court. He became Chief Justice in 1984 and resigned in 2000.

== Educations ==
- University of Indonesia
- National College of the State Judiciary, Reno, United States in 1973
- America Academy of Judicial Education, Tescaloosa, United States in 1973
- Academy of American and International Law, Dallas, United States in 1980

== Career ==
Siregar is an alumnus of University of Indonesia and started his career as a prosecutor for The State Attorney Kilkenny in 1957 and continued until 1959 in the State Attorney Makassar / Ambon in 1959 up to 1961's career as a judge began in 1961 in the District Court Pangkalpinang.

== Death ==
He was bleeding in the head with a sudden loss of consciousness before 16 April 2012 when painting at home. He finally died on Thursday, 19 April 2012 at 12:25 pm in Fatmawati Hospital.
