= Logik (poem) =

Poem by Joachim Ringelnatz

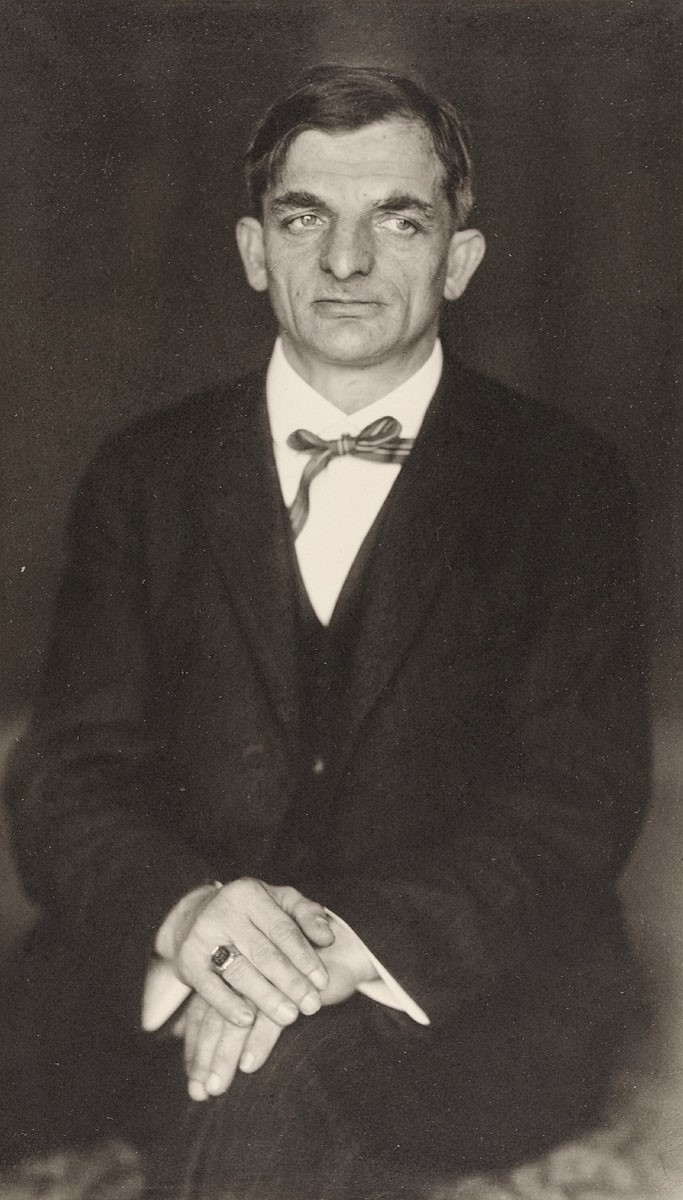
Joachim Ringelnatz, portrayed by Hugo Erfurth, ca. 1930

Logik is one of the most recited poems of the German poet and painter Joachim Ringelnatz (1883–1934).

== Poem ==
Logik
Die Nacht war kalt und sternenklar,
Da trieb im Meer bei Norderney
Ein Suahelischnurrbarthaar.—
Die nächste Schiffsuhr wies auf drei.

Mir scheint da mancherlei nicht klar,
Man fragt doch, wenn man Logik hat,
Was sucht ein Suahelihaar
Denn nachts um drei am Kattegat?

=== Translation ===
Logic
The night was starry, cold the air.
There in the sea near Norderney
Swam a Swahili mustache hair.—
The next ship clock points to three.

A couple of things don't seem clear.
Hence one asks with logic mind-set
What is a Swahili hair doing here?
At three o'clock on the Kattegat ?
Translated by Natias Neutert

== Literary-historical classification ==
=== Genesis ===
Logik was written in the time after the turn of the century, and first published 1912 under Joachim Ringelnatz's real name Hans Böttcher in his book Die Schnupftabakdose (The snuffbox).

=== Titling ===
The titling of the poem is pure irony. The title Logic is very factual, in contradiction to the perceivable surreal content of the poem itself. „Because it is inconceivable in our real world that a single hair of a mustache could ever be detected in seawater.“ In face of all logic, impossible things happen.

=== Versification ===
Both stanzas are set according to the rhyme scheme A B A B, where the first and third lines, and the second and fourth lines are rhyming equivalent to each other at the end.

=== Theme and motif ===
The theme of the two-stanza poem is an absurd observation, made by an only slightly hinted, unspecified lyrical self (possibly a sailor—a role often used by Ringelnatz on stage. The observation itself is made at night from a ship, the object is a single hair of a Swahili's mustache, floating in the sea. This object of observation as a recurring figure is the motif of the poem. The individual mustache hair is downright personalized. From today's point of view we find this poem resembles those of Christian Morgenstern in their bizarre nature. Contemporary reviewers already noticed the similarity with the poems of Christian Morgenstern but Ringelnatz asserted that he had not yet known Morgenstern's poetry when he was writing his own verses.
