= Fact pattern =

Summary of the key facts of a legal case

A fact pattern or fact situation is a summary of the key facts of a particular legal case, presented without any associated discussion of their legal consequences.

For example, at common law, "Murder is the killing of another human being with malice aforethought and without justification or excuse." The elements of the crime are killing (actus reus) and malice aforethought i.e. intentional action (mens rea). Possible defenses include legal justification (e.g. self-defense) or excuse (e.g. no mens rea due to legal insanity).

The fact pattern from a homicide case might be:

"The defendant returned home at night and discovered an armed burglar within the home, and then killed the burglar."

The fact pattern can be analyzed to determine whether the elements of the crime exist and, if so, what defenses may be available to the defendant, such as in this case, the right to self defense and the lack of a duty to retreat in one's own home ("castle doctrine").

Fact patterns are an important element of law school examinations, with students expected to identify the relevant facts from the scenario presented, then summarize and synthesize the law as implicated by the fact pattern.
