= Carl Ludwig Wilhelm Grolman =

German jurist (1775–1829)

Carl Ludwig Wilhelm Grolman, since 1812 von Grolmann (born 23 July 1775 in Giessen; died 14 February 1829 in Darmstadt) was a jurist and Minister-President of the Grand Duchy of Hesse.
