= Knut Vikør =

Norwegian historian and university professor

Knut Sigurdson Vikør (born June 10, 1952) is a Norwegian historian and a professor of history at the University of Bergen. He is known for his studies on the history of Islam and Islamic law.

== Biography ==
Knut S. Vikør comes from a family of teachers whose father was an associate professor at Orkdal national gymnasium. Born on June 10, 1952, Vikør holds a master's in history and earned his PhD from the University of Bergen in 1992.

Vikør was general manager of the Center for Middle Eastern and Islamic Studies at the University of Bergen from 1988 to 2002 when he was granted leave to work as an associate professor at the Department of History of the same university.

In 2005, Vikør was appointed associate professor at the institute, and is now serving as a professor at the Department of Archeology, History, Cultural and Religious Studies at the University of Bergen.

== Bibliography ==
Besides his academic dissertations, Vikør has written several books aimed at general public. His books include:

- Sufi and Scholar on the Desert Edge: Muhammad b. 'Ali al-Sanusi and his Brotherhood (Northwestern University Press, 1995)
- The Exoteric Ahmad Ibn Idrīs. A Sufi's Critique of the Madhahib and the Wahhabis: Four Arabic texts with translation and commentary (with Bernd Radtke, John O'Kane, and R.S. O'Fahey, 2000)
- Between God and the Sultan: A History of Islamic Law (Oxford University Press, 2005)
- The Maghreb Since 1800: A Short History (Hurst & Company, 2012)
