= Attentional control =

Individual's capacity to choose what they pay attention to and what they ignore

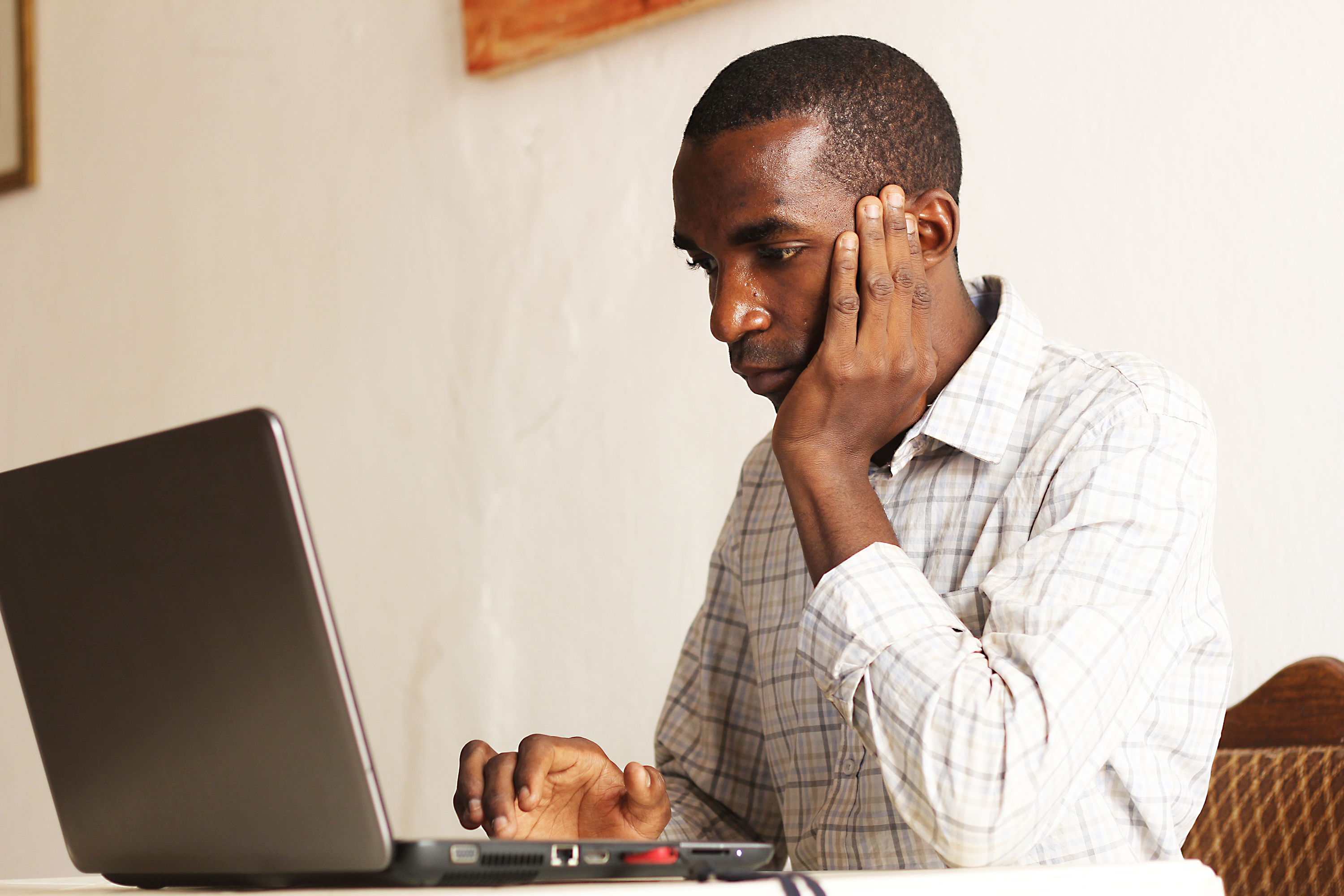
A person concentrating on his work

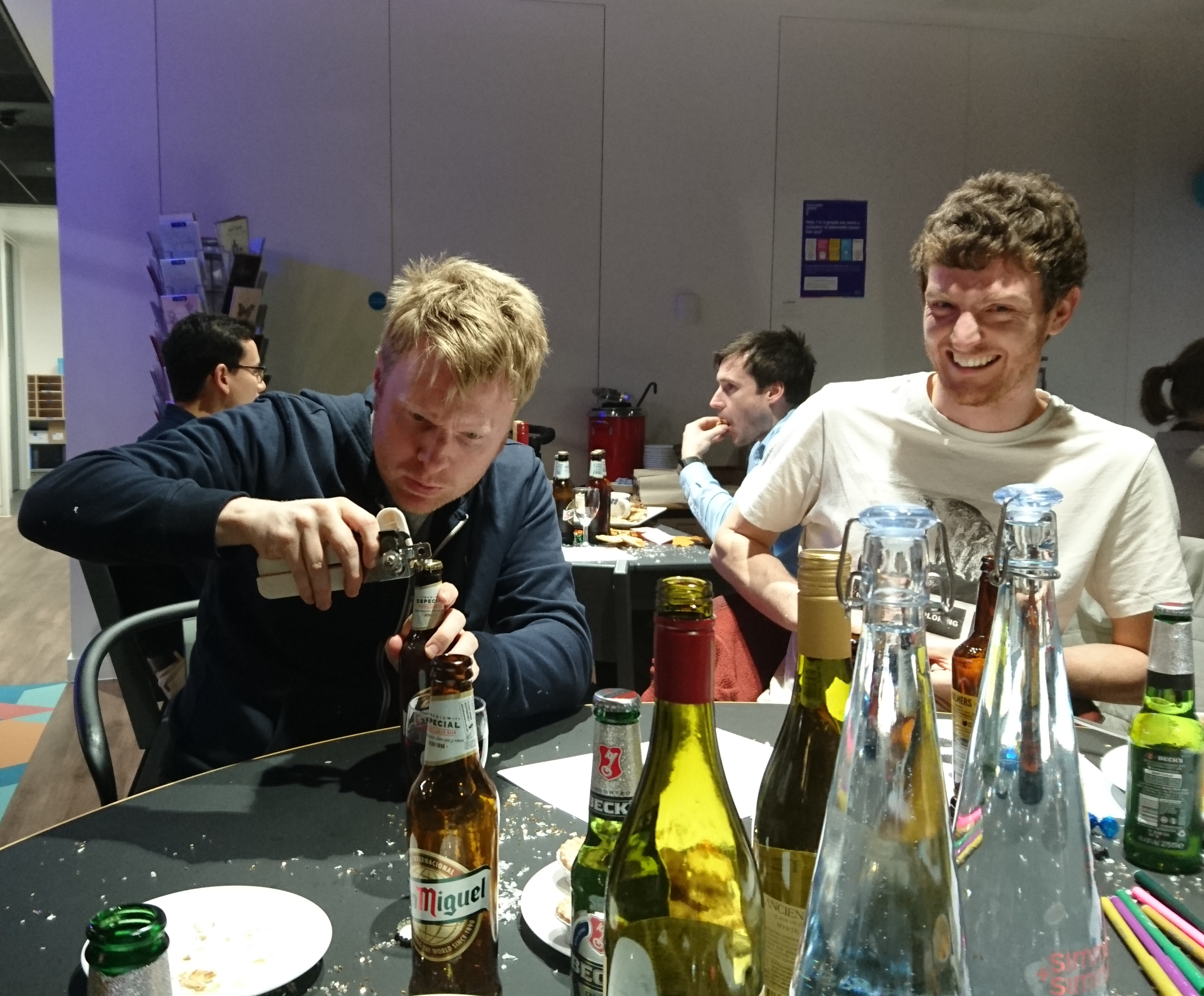
A person paying close visual attention to their use of a bottle opener, ignoring the other people around him

Attentional control, commonly referred to as concentration, refers to an individual's capacity to choose what they pay attention to and what they ignore. It is also known as endogenous attention or executive attention. In lay terms, attentional control can be described as an individual's ability to focus. Primarily mediated by the frontal areas of the brain including the anterior cingulate cortex, attentional control and attentional shifting are thought to be closely related to other executive functions such as working memory.

== General overview of research ==
Sources of attention in the brain create a system of three networks: alertness (maintaining awareness), orientation (information from sensory input), and executive control (resolving conflict). These three networks have been studied using experimental designs involving adults, children, and monkeys, with and without abnormalities of attention. Research designs include the Stroop task and flanker task, which study executive control with analysis techniques including event-related functional magnetic resonance image (fMRI). While some research designs focus specifically on one aspect of attention (such as executive control), others experiments view several areas, which examine interactions between the alerting, orienting, and executive control networks. More recently, the Attention Network Test (ANT), designed by Fan and Posner, has been used to obtain efficiency measures of the three networks, and allow their relationships to be examined. It was designed as a behavioural task simple enough to obtain data from children, patients, and animals. The task requires participants to quickly respond to cues given on a computer screen, while having their attention fixated on a center target.

== Development ==
=== Infancy ===
Early researchers studying the development of the frontal cortex thought that it was functionally silent during the first year of life. Similarly, early research suggested that infants aged one year or younger are completely passive in the allocation of their attention, and have no capacity to choose what they pay attention to and what they ignore. This is shown, for example, in the phenomenon of 'sticky fixation', whereby infants are incapable of disengaging their attention from a particularly salient target. Other research has suggested, however, that even very young infants do have some capacity to exercise control over their allocation of attention, albeit in a much more limited sense.

=== Childhood ===
As the frontal lobes mature, children's capacity to exercise attentional control increases, although attentional control abilities remain much poorer in children than they do in adults. Some children show impaired development of attentional control abilities, thought to arise from the relatively slower development of frontal areas of the brain, which sometimes results in a diagnosis of Attention Deficit Hyperactivity Disorder (ADHD).

=== Elderly ===
Some studies of aging and cognition focus on working memory processes and declines in attentional control. One study used fMRI measures during a Stroop task comparing neural activity of attentional control in younger (21–27 years) and older participants (60–75 years). Conditions included increased competition and increased conflict. Results showed evidence of decreases in responsiveness in brain areas associated with attentional control for the older group. This result suggests that older people may have decreases in their ability to utilize attentional control in their everyday lives.

A major contributor to age-related decreased attentional control includes the weight of the brain. Several studies conclude that the brain experiences rapid weight loss after the age of 60. This loss of brain weight results from a decrease in cerebral white matter and gray matter. White matter is the area in the brain responsible for exchanging information between gray matter areas. Gray matter tissue in the central nervous system enables individuals to interact with the world and carry out highly skilled functions. Studies reveal that individuals who engage in physical activity increase the cortical volume of gray matter later in life, preventing age-related atrophy and promoting attentional control. However, because most individuals' brains undergo pathological changes after the age of 80 or develop cardiac disease, neuron loss occurs and the brain volume decreases.

== Abnormal development ==
Disrupted attentional control has been noted not just in the early development of conditions for which the core deficit is related to attention such as ADHD, but also in conditions such as autism and anxiety. Disrupted attentional control has also been reported in infants born preterm, as well as in infants with genetic disorders such as Down syndrome and Williams syndrome. Several groups have also reported impaired attentional control early in development in children from lower socioeconomic status families.

The patterns of disrupted attentional control relate to findings of disrupted performance on executive functions tasks such as working memory across a wide number of different disorder groups. The question of why the executive functions appear to be disrupted across so many different disorder groups remains, however, poorly understood.

=== Relevance to mental illness ===
Studies have shown that there is a high probability that those with low attentional control also experience other mental conditions. Low attentional control is more common among those with attention deficit hyperactivity disorder (ADHD), "a disorder with persistent age-inappropriate symptoms of inattention, hyperactivity, and impulsivity that are sufficient to cause impairment in major life activities". Low attentional control is also common in individuals with schizophrenia and Alzheimer's disease, those with social anxiety, trait anxiety, and depression, and attention difficulties following a stroke. Individuals respond quicker and have stronger overall executive control when they have low levels of anxiety and depression. Weak attentional control is also thought to increase chances of developing a psychopathological condition, as these individuals have disrupted threat processing and magnified emotional responses to threat. More researchers are accounting for attentional control in studies that might not necessarily focus on attention by having participants fill out an Attentional Control Scale (ACS) or a Cognitive Attentional Syndrome-1 (CAS1), both of which are self-reporting questionnaires that measure attentional focus and shifting. Researchers suggest that people should use experimental and longitudinal designs to address the relationship between ACS, emotional functioning, CAS, and attention to threat. This is due to the increasing problematic occurrences experts are seeing in the field regarding attentional control in relation to other mental illnesses.

Attention problems are also characteristic of anxiety disorders like PTSD (Post-Traumatic Stress Disorder). A recent review revealed that 61.2% of current studies found that participants who experienced PTSD suffered from significant attentional control problems. These problems caused by PTSD can lead to the development of an attentional bias, which causes a person to process emotionally negative information preferentially over emotionally positive information. Patients who suffer from PTSD commonly struggle to concentrate on certain tasks for longer periods of time, allowing intrusive thoughts to override their current focus. This interference can be caused by many different factors, but it is most commonly triggered by emotional cues, particularly the emotion of fear. Attention is considered a gateway function to advanced cognitive processes such as memory and learning, and attentional interference can cause such cognitive processes to decrease. In recent years, attentional control therapies have been used to improve attentional control in patients who suffer from PTSD. More recently, yoga and meditation were found to positivity affect attentional control in patients who have experienced PTSD.

== Applications ==
=== Performance ===
Attentional control theory focuses on anxiety and cognitive performance. The assumption of this theory is that the effects of anxiety on attentional control are key to understanding the relationship between anxiety and performance. In general, anxiety inhibits attentional control on a specific task by impairing processing efficiency. There are three functions associated with this theory. The inhibition function prevents stimuli unrelated to a task and responses from disrupting performance. The shifting function is used to allocate attention to the stimuli that are most relevant to the task. The updating function is used to update and monitor information in working memory. There are three main hypotheses associated with attentional control theory. First, the efficiency of the central executive is impaired by anxiety. Second, anxiety impairs the inhibition function, and third, anxiety impairs the shifting function. Studies related to attentional control and performance take two differing approaches. Specifically, research on attentional capture has two modes: voluntary and reflexive. The voluntary mode is a top down approach where attention is shifted according to high-level cognitive processes. The reflexive mode is a bottom up approach where attention shifts involuntarily based on a stimulus's attention attracting properties. These modes are important to understanding how attentional control works.

=== Mindfulness ===
Even four days of mindfulness meditation training can significantly improve visuo-spatial processing, working memory and executive functioning. However, research has shown mixed results surrounding whether mindfulness effects attentional control directly. Participants did tasks of sustained attention, inhibition, switching, and object detection. These tasks were done before and after an 8-week mindfulness based stress reduction course (MBSR), and were compared to a control group. There were no significant differences between the groups, meaning that the MBSR course did not affect attentional control. However, an active randomized controlled trial showed that a mobile-based mindfulness app with extensive self-assessment features may have long-term benefits for attentional control in healthy participants. Mindfulness influences non-directed attention and other things like emotional well-being.

=== Learning ===
Modular approaches view cognitive development as a mosaic-like process, according to which cognitive faculties develop separately according to genetically predetermined maturational timetables. Prominent authors who take a modular approach to cognitive development include Jerry Fodor, Elizabeth Spelke and Steven Pinker. In contrast, other authors such as Annette Karmiloff-Smith, Mark Johnson and Linda Smith have instead advocated taking a more interactive or dynamical systems approaches to cognitive development. According to these approaches, which are known as neuroconstructivist approaches, cognitive systems interact over developmental time as certain cognitive faculties are required for the subsequent acquisition of other faculties in other areas.

Amongst authors who take neuroconstructivist approaches to development, particular importance has been attached to attentional control, since it is thought to be a domain-general process that may influence the subsequent acquisition of other skills in other areas. The ability to regulate and direct attention releases the child from the constraints of only responding to environmental events, and means they are able to actively guide their attention towards the information-rich areas key for learning. For example, a number of authors have looked at the relationship between an infant's capacity to exercise attentional control and their subsequent performance during language acquisition. Working memory capacity has been studied to understand how memory functions. The ability to predict the effectiveness of someone's working memory capacity comes from attentional control mechanisms. These mechanisms help with the regulation of goals, behavior, and outside distractions, which are all important for effective learning.

== Visual attentional control ==
Our brains have distinct attention systems that have been shaped throughout time by evolution. Visual attention operates mainly on three different representations: location , feature, and object-based. The spatial separation between two objects has an effect on attention. People can selectively pay attention to one of two objects in the same general location. Research has also been done on attention to non-object based things like motion. When directing attention to a feature like motion, neuronal activity increases in areas specific for the feature. When visually searching for a non-spatial feature or a perceptual feature, selectively enhancing the sensitivity to that specific feature plays a role in directing attention. When people are told to look for motion, then motion will capture their attention, but attention is not captured by motion if they are told to look for color.

=== Spatial focus of attention ===
According to fMRI studies of the brain and behavioral observations, visual attention can be moved independently of moving eye position. Studies have had participants fixate their eyes on a central point and measured brain activity as stimuli were presented outside the visual fixation point. fMRI findings show changes in brain activity correlated with the shift in spatial attention to the various stimuli. Behavioral studies have also shown that when a person knows where a stimulus is likely to appear, their attention can shift to it more rapidly and process it better.

Other studies have demonstrated that perceptual and cognitive load affect spatial focusing of attention. These two mechanisms interact oppositely so that when cognitive load is decreased, perceptual load must be high to increase spatial attention focusing.

== Auditory alertness ==
The cocktail party effect is the phenomenon that a person hears his or her name even when not attending to the conversation. To study this, a screening measure for attentional control was given that tested a person's ability to keep track of words while also doing math problems. Participants were separated into two groups---low and high span attentional control ability groups. They listened to two word lists read simultaneously by a male and a female voice and were told to ignore the male voice. Their name was read by the "ignored" male voice. Low span people were more likely to hear their name compared to high span people. This result suggests that people with lower attentional control ability have more trouble inhibiting information from the surrounding environment.

== See also ==
- Attention
- Delayed gratification
- Dysexecutive syndrome
- Executive dysfunction
- Executive functions
- Flow (psychology)
- Frontal lobe
- Self control
- Visual selective attention in dementia
