= Church key (disambiguation) =

Church key may refer to:

- Church key, a type of a bottle opener
- "Church Key", a 1960 instrumental track by California surf group The Revels
- Churchkey Can Company, an American brewery
