= Interactive specialization =

Theory of brain development

Interactive Specialization is a theory of brain development proposed by the British developmental cognitive neuroscientist Mark Johnson, formerly head of the Centre for Brain and Cognitive Development at Birkbeck, University of London, London and who is now Head of Psychology at the University of Cambridge.

In his book Developmental Cognitive Neuroscience , Johnson contrasts two views of development. According to the first, the maturational hypothesis, the relationship between structure and function (i.e. which parts of the brain perform a particular task) is static, and specific cognitive skills come “on-line” as the cortical circuitry intrinsic to a particular task matures. Johnson likens this to a "mosaic" view of development.

According to the second, the Interactive Specialization (IS) hypothesis, development is not a unidirectional maturational process, but rather a set of complex, dynamic and back-propagated interactions between genetics, brain, body and environment. Development is not a simple question of a brain being built according to a pre-specified genetic blueprint - rather, the components of the brain are interacting with each other constantly - even prenatally, when patterns of spontaneous firing of cells in the eyes (before they have opened) transmit signals that appear to help develop the layered structure of the lateral geniculate nucleus .

The hypothesis has attracted increasing attention in recent years as a number of neuroimaging studies on younger children have provided data that appears to fit specific predictions made by Johnson's model .

== Influences ==
In 1996, Johnson co-authored (with Jeffrey Elman, Annette Karmiloff-Smith, Elizabeth Bates, Domenico Parisi, and Kim Plunkett), the book Rethinking Innateness , which argues against a strong nativist (innate) view on development. Other key influences include Gilbert Gottlieb's theory of Probabilistic Epigenesis , a framework that emphasizes the reciprocity and ubiquity of gene-environment interaction in the realization of all phenotypes, and work on developmental disorders by Annette Karmiloff-Smith.
