= East Pole–West Pole divide =

The East Pole–West Pole divide in the fields of cognitive psychology and cognitive neuroscience is an intellectual schism between researchers subscribing to the nativist and empiricist schools of thought. The term arose from the fact that much of the theory and research supporting nativism, modularity of mind, and computational theory of mind originated at several universities located on the East Coast, including Harvard University, the University of Michigan, Massachusetts Institute of Technology, and Tufts University. Conversely, much of the research and theory supporting empiricism, emergentism, and embodied cognition originated at several universities located on the West Coast, including the University of California, Berkeley, the Salk Institute, and, most notably, the University of California, San Diego. In reality, the divide is not so clear, with many universities and scholars on both coasts (as well as the Midwest and around the world) supporting each position, as well as more moderate positions in between the two extremes. The phrase was coined by Jerry Fodor at an MIT conference on cognition, at which he referred to another researcher as a "West Coast theorist," apparently unaware that the researcher worked at Yale University.

Very few researchers adhere strictly to the extreme positions highlighted by the East Pole–West Pole debate. That is, there are very few empiricists who believe in the Lockean ideal of the tabula rasa (namely, that children are born with no innate knowledge or constraints), and there are very few nativists who agree with Fodor's assertion that all concepts that are learned over the course of life are present in the mind prior to birth. Nevertheless, most scholars within the fields of cognitive science and developmental psychology affiliate themselves with one of the two positions through the means of their research.

The two books best known for espousing the empiricist and nativist positions within the context of cognitive psychology are Rethinking Innateness by Jeffrey Elman et al. and The Modularity of Mind by Jerry Fodor, respectively. Incidentally, the authors are affiliated with the two institutions on which the East Pole–West Pole metaphor is based, UCSD and MIT, affirming the relevance and pervasiveness of this moniker for the intellectual divide.

== Notable scholars with affiliations ==
Nativists

- Jerry Fodor, Massachusetts Institute of Technology
- Steven Pinker, Harvard University
- Lila R. Gleitman, University of Pennsylvania
- Leda Cosmides, University of California, Santa Barbara
- Elizabeth Spelke, Harvard University
- Thomas Bever, University of Arizona
- Daniel Dennett, Tufts University
- Nancy Kanwisher, Massachusetts Institute of Technology

Empiricists

- Elizabeth Bates, University of California, San Diego
- George Lakoff, University of California, Berkeley
- Brian MacWhinney, Carnegie Mellon University
- Jeffrey Elman, University of California, San Diego
- Ronald Langacker, University of California, San Diego
- Dan Slobin, University of California, Berkeley
- David Rumelhart, Stanford University
- James McClelland, Stanford University

== See also ==
- Nature and nurture
- Empiricism
- Psychological nativism
- Computational theory of mind
- Embodied cognition
- Reductionism
- Emergentism
