= West Pole =

West Pole or The West Pole may refer to:

- The West Pole, a 2009 album by The Gathering
- The West Pole, in Bee Cave, Texas
- The West Pole, a 1994 book by American author Diane Glancy

== See also ==
- East Pole–West Pole divide, division in the fields of cognitive psychology and cognitive neuroscience
- West Polesian
- West Polesie
