= Rethinking Innateness =

1996 book about gene-environment interaction

Rethinking Innateness: A connectionist perspective on development is a book regarding gene/environment interaction by Jeffrey Elman, Annette Karmiloff-Smith, Elizabeth Bates, Mark Johnson, Domenico Parisi, and Kim Plunkett published in 1996. It has been cited about 4,000 times in scientific articles, and has been nominated as one of the "One hundred most influential works in cognitive science from the 20th Century".

== Summary ==
Rethinking Innateness applied insights from neurobiology and neural network modelling to brain development.

It questioned whether some of the "hard nativist" positions, such as those adopted by Noam Chomsky, Steven Pinker and Elizabeth Spelke, are biologically plausible. For example, the authors challenged a claim by Pinker that children are born with innate domain-specific knowledge of the principles of grammar, by questioning how the knowledge that Pinker suggests might actually be encoded in the genes.

Elman et al. argue that information concerning something as specific as grammatical rules (which they classify as propositional information) could only be encoded as pre-specified "weights" between neurons in the cortex. But they argue that evidence from a number of sources, such as brain plasticity (the ability of a brain to change its response properties during development) shows that information cannot be hard-wired in this way.

Instead, they argue that genes might influence brain development by determining a system's "architectural constraints". By establishing the physical structure of a system, they argue that genes would, in effect, be determining the learning algorithms the system employs to respond to the environment. They argue that the specific propositional information in the system would be determined as a result of the system responding to environmental stimulation.

== Influences ==
The ideas in Rethinking Innateness have been influential and developed in a number of ways. For example Mark Johnson has gone on to develop his Interactive Specialization hypothesis, in part building on ideas from Rethinking Innateness. Jeffrey Elman has also gone on to become one of the most widely recognized figures in computational neuroscience, recently being awarded the David E. Rumelhart Prize for Theoretical Contributions to Cognitive Science.

== See also ==
- Innateness hypothesis
- Connectionism
