= Annette Karmiloff-Smith =

Developmental psychologist (1938–2016)

Annette Karmiloff-Smith CBE FBA FMedSci
- Born: 1938
- Died: 19 December 2016 (aged 78)
- Employers: Institute of Child Health, University College, London; Birkbeck, University of London
- Known for: Expertise in developmental disorders
- Annette Karmiloff-Smith's voice from the BBC programme The Life Scientific, 22 January 2013.

Annette Karmiloff-Smith CBE FBA FMedSci (1938–2016) was a professorial research fellow at the Developmental Neurocognition Lab at Birkbeck, University of London. Before moving to Birbeck, she was Head of the Neurocognitive Development Unit at Institute of Child Health, University College, London. She was an expert in developmental disorders, with a particular interest in Williams syndrome.

Karmiloff-Smith argued against approaches that take a modality-specific approach to developmental disorders - approaches that state, for example, that autism arises because of a failure of the "theory of mind" module, or that children with specific language impairment lack a genetically determined "language module".

Karmiloff-Smith argued that these approaches assume a "mosaic-like" approach to cognitive development - according to which different systems within the brain develop separately from each other, based purely on information coded in the genes. The real picture of development is, she argued, much more complicated (see Interactive Specialization). Development comes about as a result of back-propagating interactions between gene, brain, behavior, and the environment; "modules" (those parts of the brain that are, for example, specialized at processing language) appear relatively late in development. Since developmental disorders arise from problems during development (as opposed to damage to a mature system) it follows that we should expect to find performance deficits that are not linked to one particular domain, but rather spread across a whole range of different performance impairments.

Karmiloff-Smith supported her theories by her research work into Williams syndrome. This rare syndrome was originally thought to manifest itself as abnormally low IQ, accompanied by "normal" ability to process social cues. In a series of papers (e.g.), Karmiloff-Smith and colleagues discovered that impairments in Williams syndrome are far more widespread than had previously been appreciated. Her theories have been further supported by work in other fields. For example, autistic children have been found to be impaired not just at Theory of Mind but also at a variety of tasks including motion perception, visual search and multi-tasking (e.g.), a finding that domain-specific theories have difficulty accounting for.

Karmiloff-Smith authored a number of books and academic articles, most notably Beyond Modularity in 1992 and Rethinking Innateness with Jeffrey Elman, Mark Johnson, Elizabeth Bates, Domenico Parisi, and Kim Plunkett in 1996.

She died on 19 December 2016 at the age of 78.
