= Mark H. Johnson =

British cognitive neuroscientist (born 1960)

Mark Johnson FBA
- Born: Mark Henry Johnson; 1960 (age 65–66)
- Education: University of Edinburgh (BSc); University of Cambridge (PhD)
- Known for: Rethinking Innateness
- Awards: Queen's Anniversary Prize (2006)
- Scientific career
- Workplaces: University of Cambridge; Carnegie Mellon University; Birkbeck, University of London
- Thesis: An analysis of the neural systems underlying filial preference behaviour in the domestic chick (1985)
- Doctoral advisor: Patrick Bateson
- Website: www.psychol.cam.ac.uk/people/professor-mark-johnson

Mark Henry Johnson FBA (born 1960) is a British cognitive neuroscientist who, since October 2017, has been Professor of Experimental Psychology and Head of the Department of Psychology at the University of Cambridge. He is a Fellow of Kings College Cambridge, the British Academy, the Cognitive Science society, and the Association for Psychological Science.

== Education ==
Johnson was educated at the University of Edinburgh (BSc) and the University of Cambridge where his PhD was supervised by Patrick Bateson. He was a postgraduate student at King's College, Cambridge.

== Career and research ==
In 1996, Johnson co-authored, (with Jeffrey Elman, Annette Karmiloff-Smith, Elizabeth Bates, Domenico Parisi, and Kim Plunkett), the book Rethinking Innateness, which examines neural network approaches to development. In the book, Elman et al. propose that genetic information might provide "constraints" on how a dynamic network responds to the environment during learning. For example, they suggest that a learning system can be seen as being subject to architectural constraints during development, an idea that gave birth to the neural network field of constructivist modelling. Rethinking Innateness has received more than 4,000 citations, and was nominated as one of the "One hundred most influential works in cognitive science from the 20th Century" (Minnesota Millennium Project).

Johnson has gone on to develop an Interactive Specialization approach to development, that views cognitive brain development as a series of back-propagated interactions between genetics, brain, body and environment. This model of cognitive development emphasises that development is a stochastic, network-based, interactive process. As such, it echoes contemporary work in other areas of development, such as probabilistic epigenesis and gene regulatory networks.

In 2007, Johnson co-authored (with Denis Mareschal, Sylvain Sirois, Michael Spratling, Michael Thomas and Gert Westermann) Neuroconstructivism, which discusses the relationship between cognition, the brain and the environment. Specifically, they argue that "the brain acquires and develops multiple, fragmentary representations that are just sufficient for on-the-fly processing" and that these representations "serve to cause behaviours rather than to mirror the environment." Volume 2 contains a variety of neural network models that investigate how these representations change during learning (including models from Randy O’Reilly, Matthew Schlesinger and Yuko Munakata).

Johnson specialises in the development of the brain networks subserving social cognition. He is the author of more than 400 papers, and has written or edited ten books, most notably his textbook Developmental Cognitive Neuroscience He previously served, with Denis Mareschal, as co-editor of the journal Developmental Science.
