= Beverage opener =

Device used to open beverage cans

A beverage opener (also known as a multi-opener) is a device used to open beverage cans, plastic bottles or glass bottles, which are the three most common beverage containers.

== Types ==
Beverage openers vary in size but commonly include a glass bottle crown cork remover, glass bottle threaded metal crown cork cap grip for greater twisting torque, a plastic bottle cap grip for greater twisting torque and a stay tab lever for metal beverage cans. Some openers have extra conveniences built in such as magnetic backing to catch and hold metal caps or stick to a refrigerator door. They may be standalone devices or be incorporated into can openers.

== Benefits ==
Beverage openers are useful for opening everyday beverage containers for those who have limited hand strength as it eliminates the need for strong twisting or pulling motions. Plastic bottles may become stuck due to a high volume of carbonation released during shipping or overtightening. Some do not have fingernails with which to properly use a stay tab and glass bottles almost always require some sort of bottle opener.

== Gallery ==
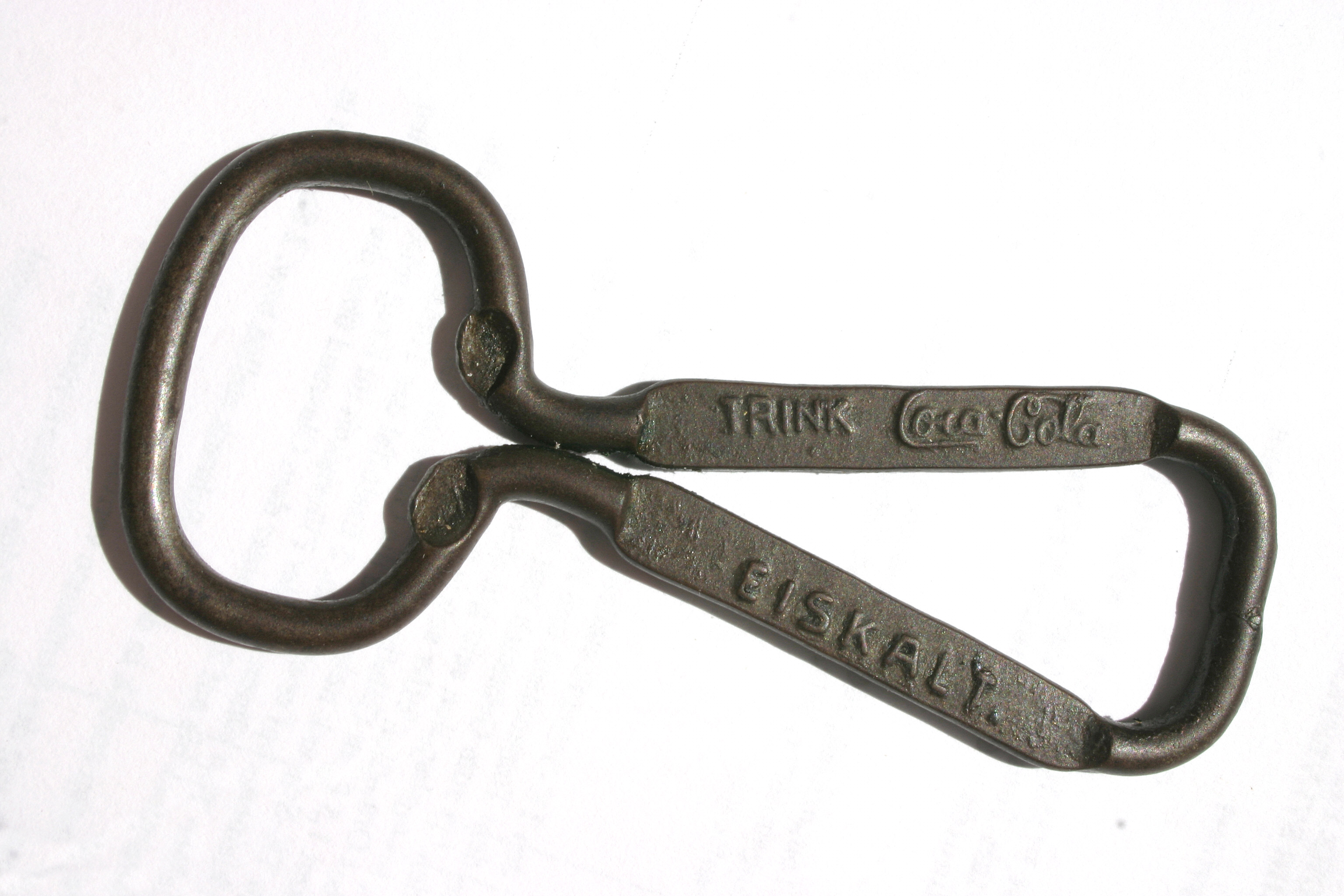

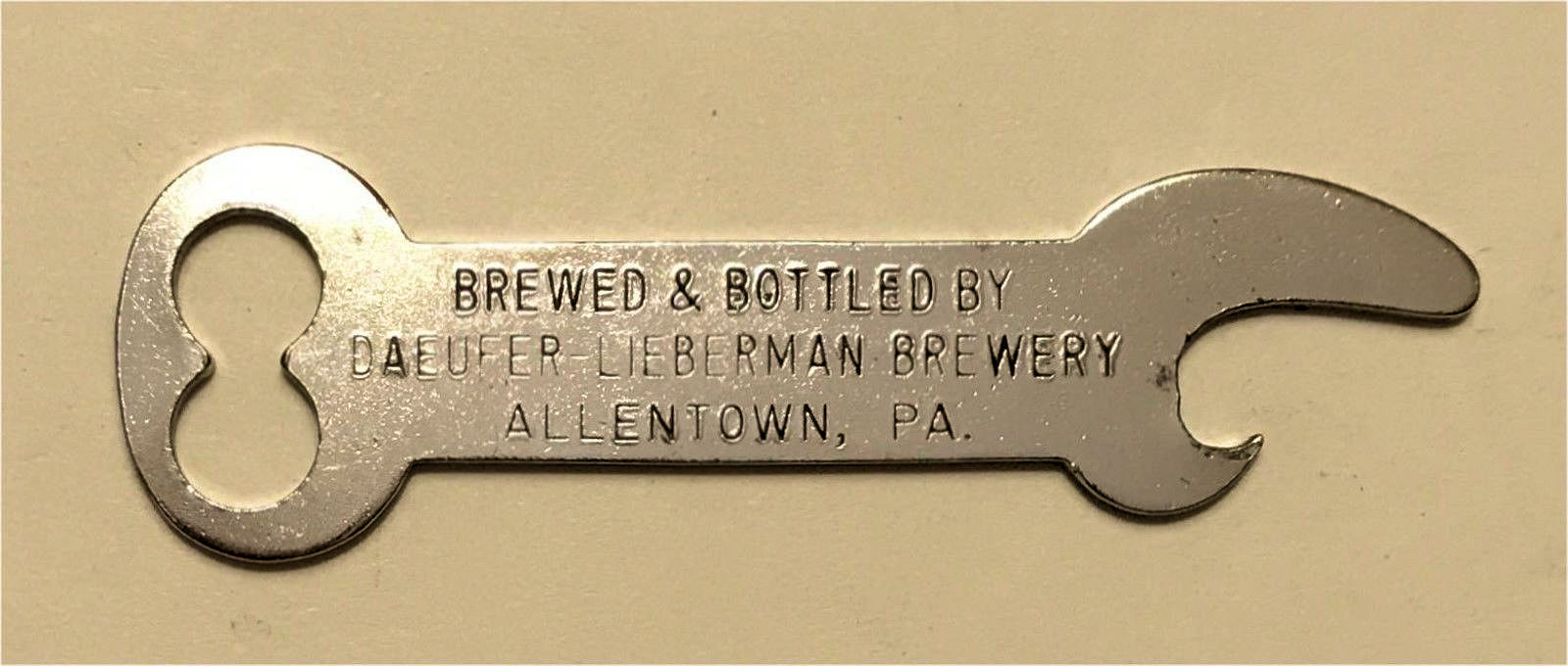

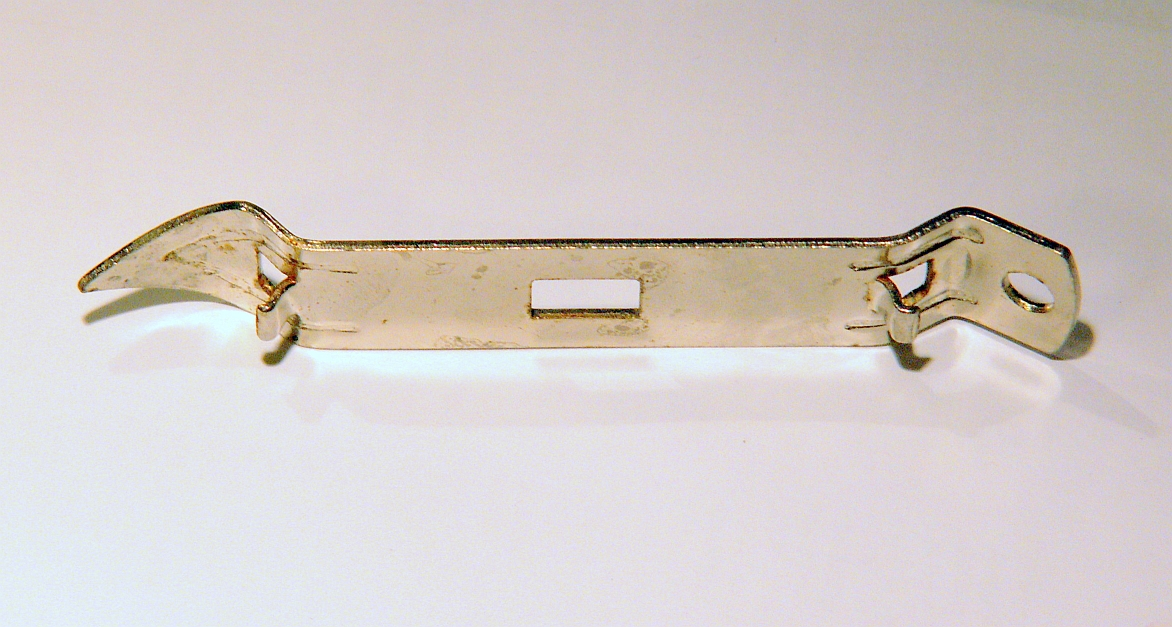
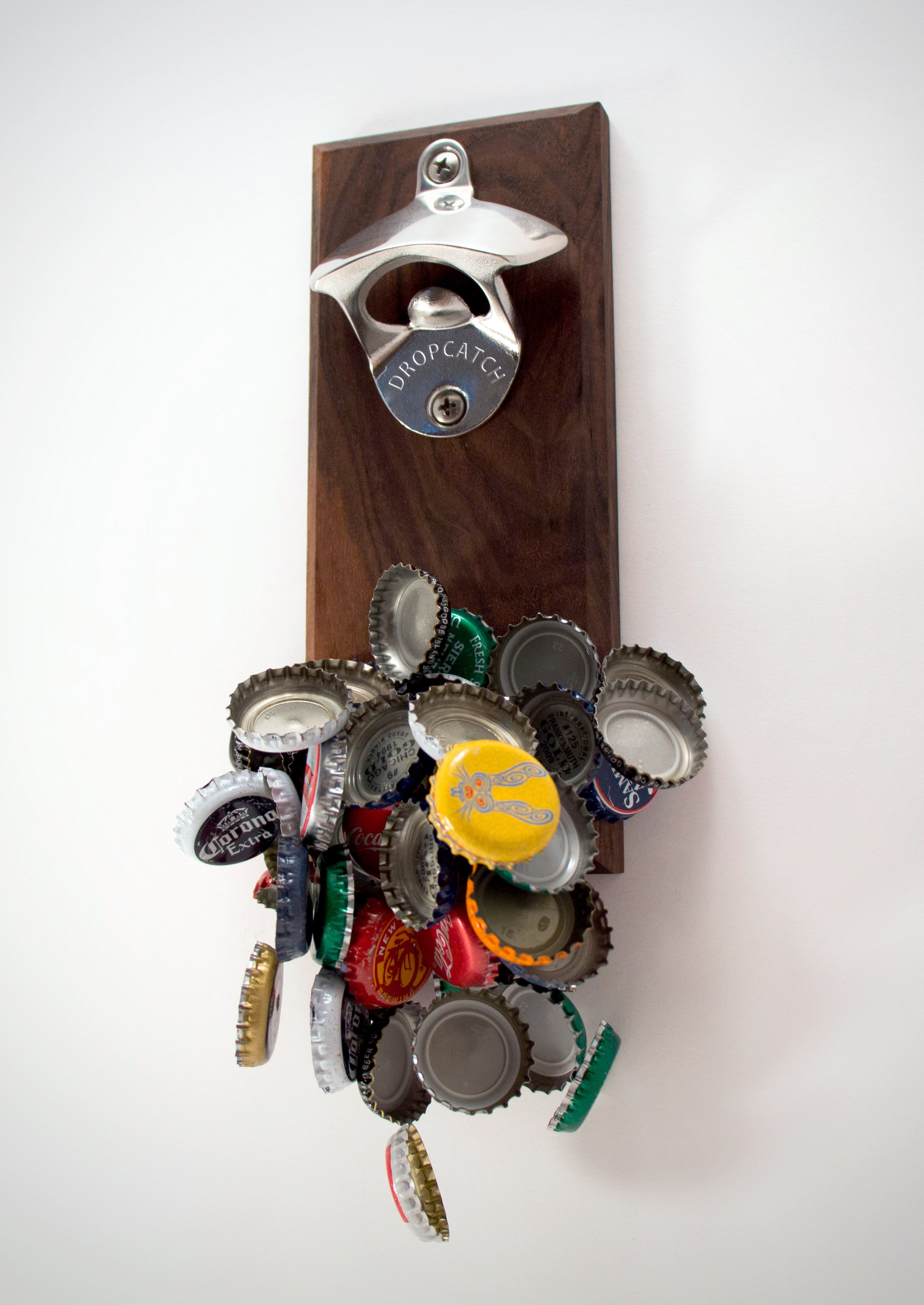

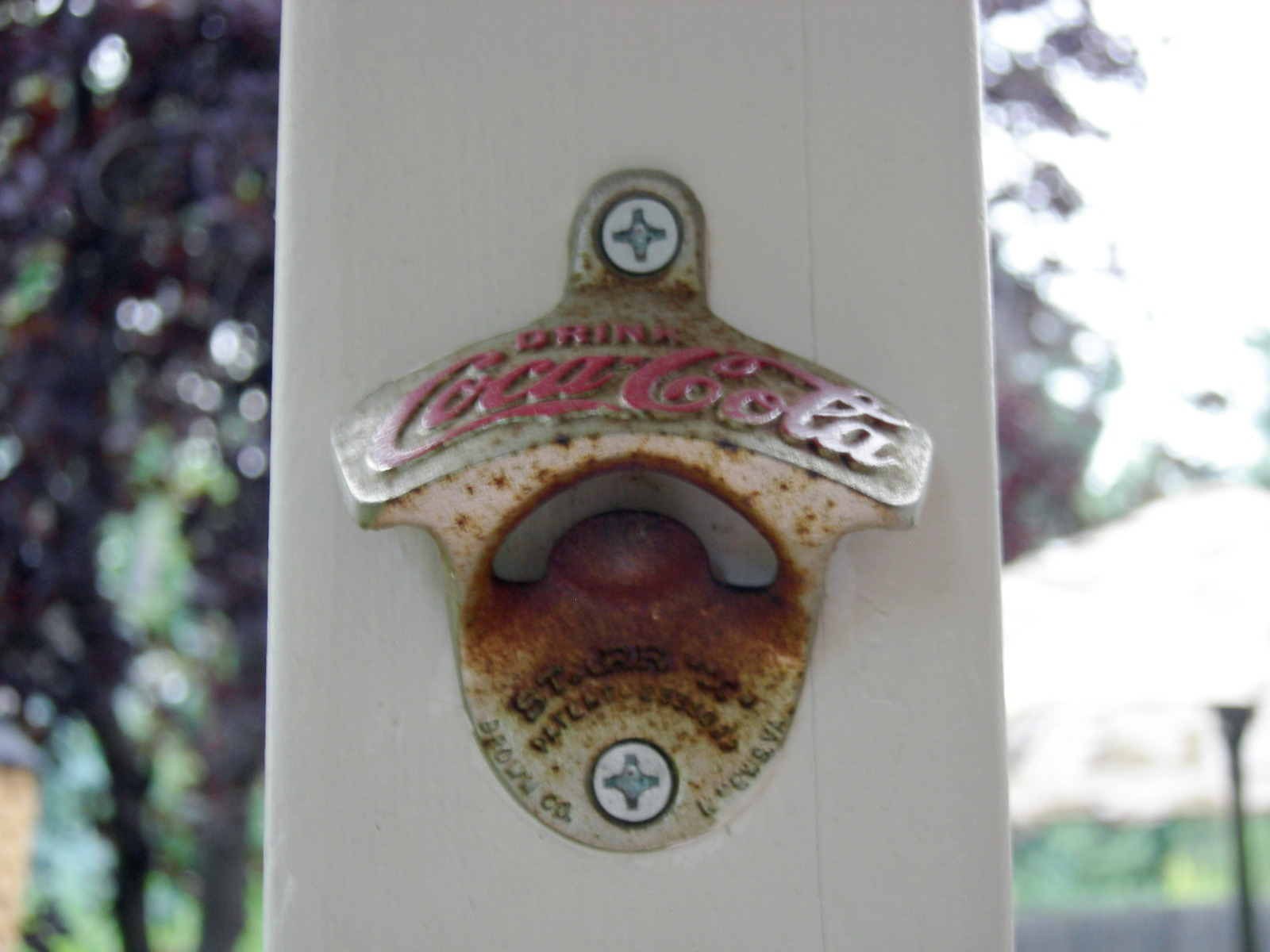

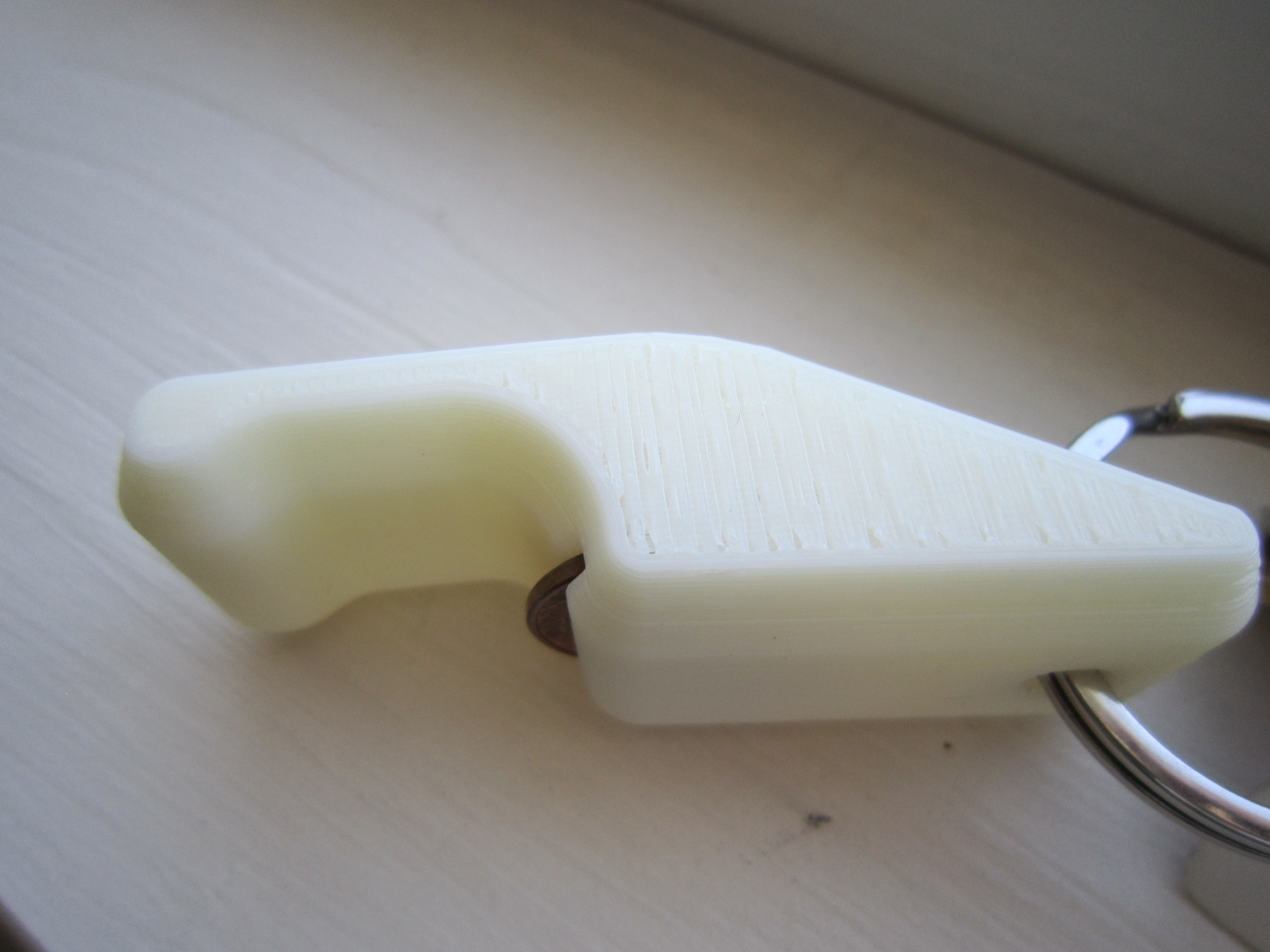

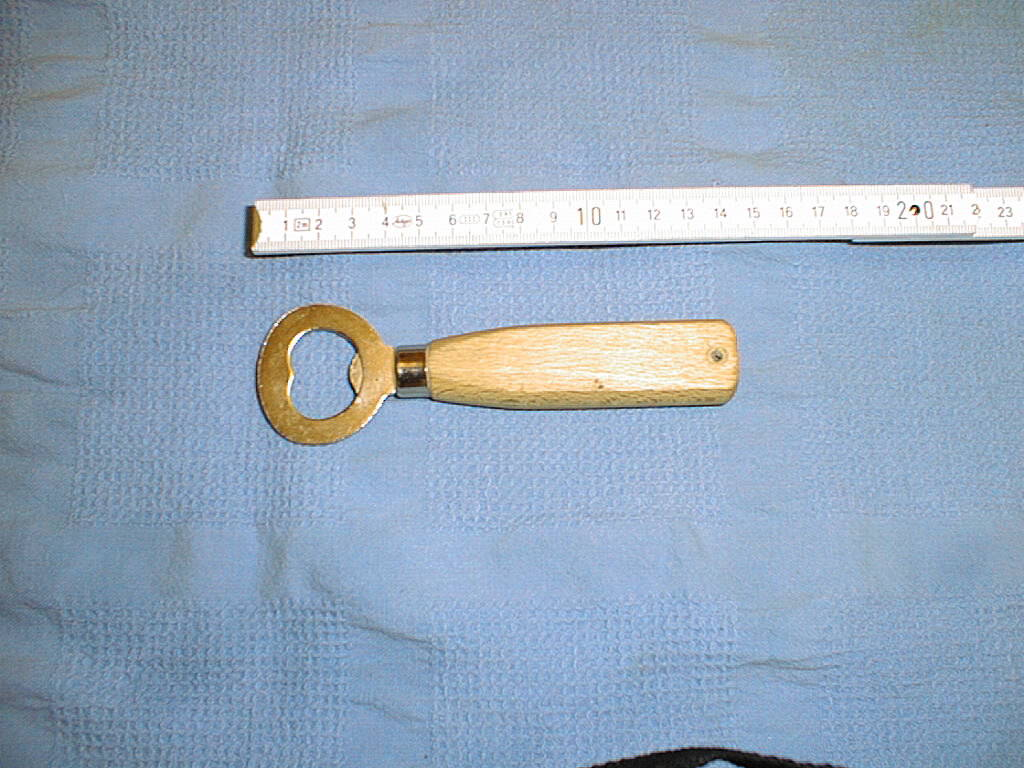
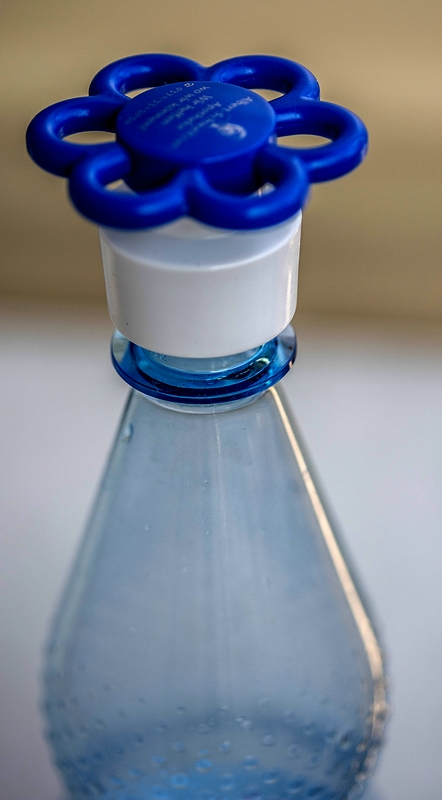

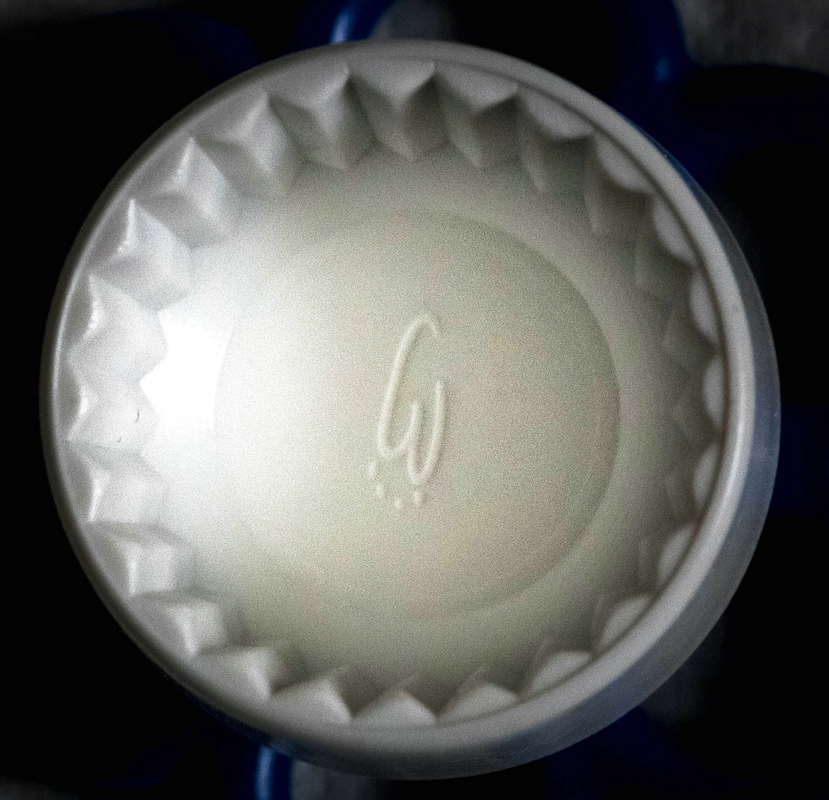

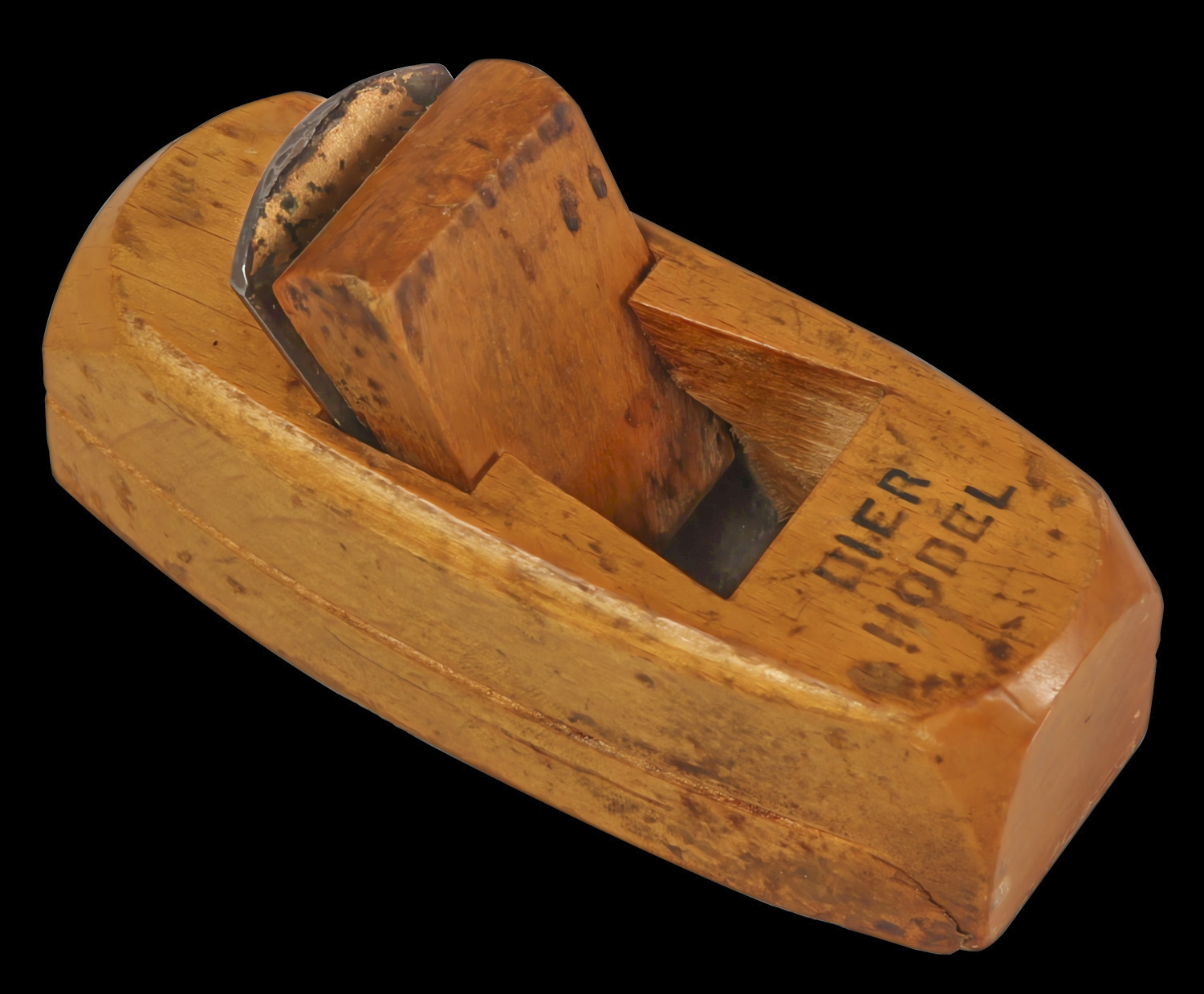

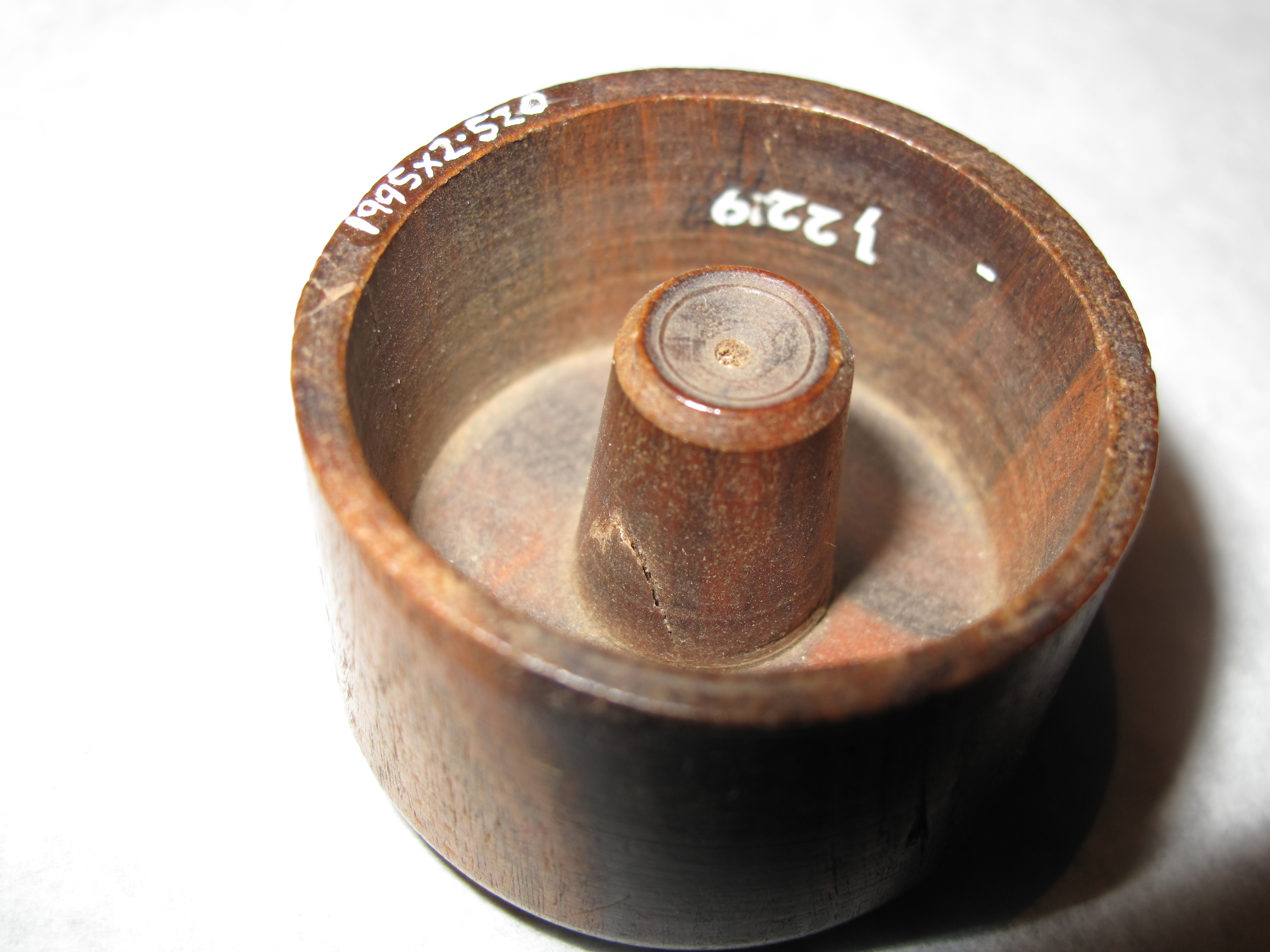

== See also ==
- Bottle cap
- Church key
- Tab (beverage can)
