= Church key =

Tool for opening bottles and cans

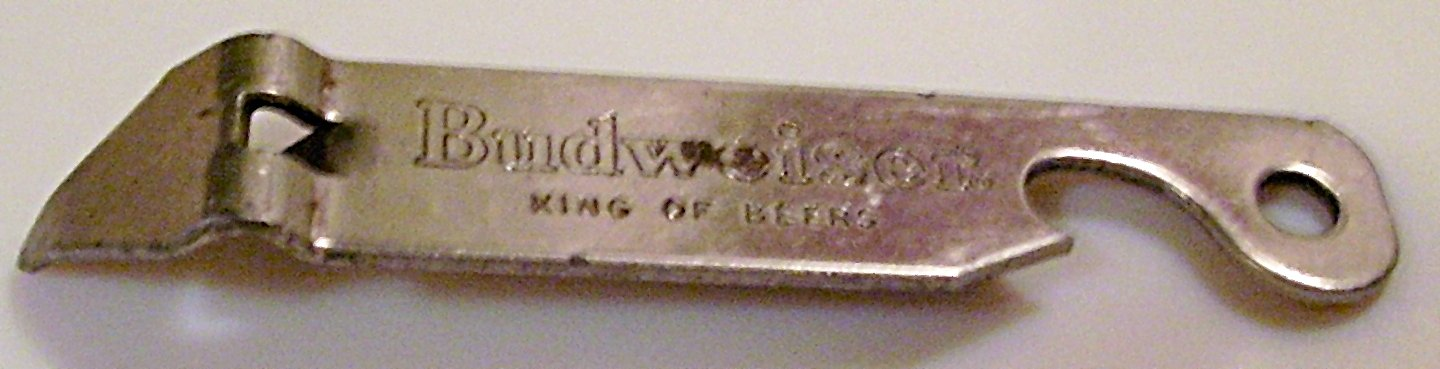
Common church key with a can piercer (left end) and bottle opener (right end)

Church key or churchkey is a North American term also used in the UK for various kinds of bottle openers and can openers.

== Etymology ==
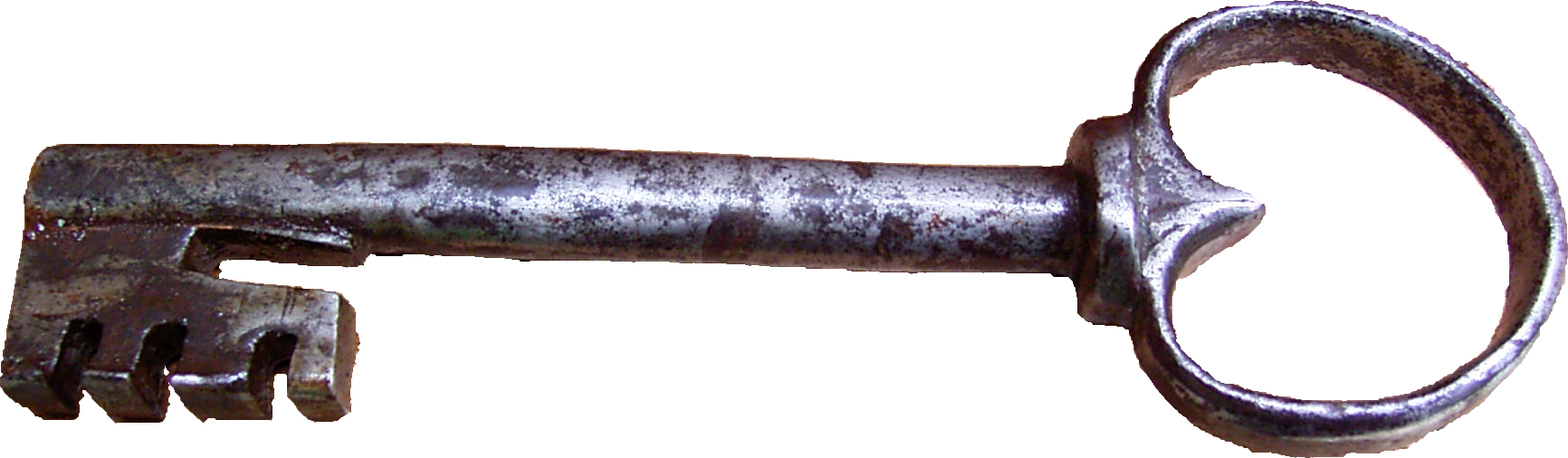
A church key in the literal sense

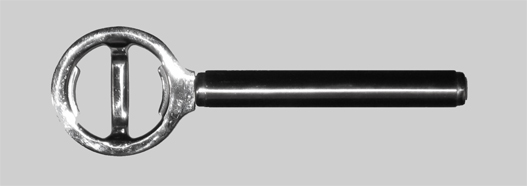
A church key in the figurative sense

The term in the beverage-opening sense is apparently not an old one; Merriam-Webster finds written attestation only since the 1950s. Several etymological themes exist. The main one is that the ends of some bottle openers resemble the heads of large keys such as have traditionally been used to lock and unlock church doors. It’s also more than probable that an irreverent joke was attached as well, in that drinking beer was an unchurchly thing to do.

== History ==
A church key initially referred to a simple hand-operated device for prying the cap off a glass bottle. Called a "crown cork" and later a “bottle cap”, this kind of closure was invented in 1892, with a patent awarded to William Painter. Two years later, Painter also received a patent on an opener, then called a "bottle cap lifter", to be used with the caps.

While there is no evidence that the opener was called a church key at that time, the shape and design of some of these openers did resemble a large simple key.

In 1935, beer cans with flat tops were marketed, and a device to puncture the lids was needed. The same term, church key, came to be used for this new invention: made from a single piece of pressed metal, with a pointed end used for piercing cans—devised by D. F. Sampson and licensed by the American Can Company, which depicted operating instructions on the cans, and typically gave away free "quick and easy" openers with cases of their canned beer.

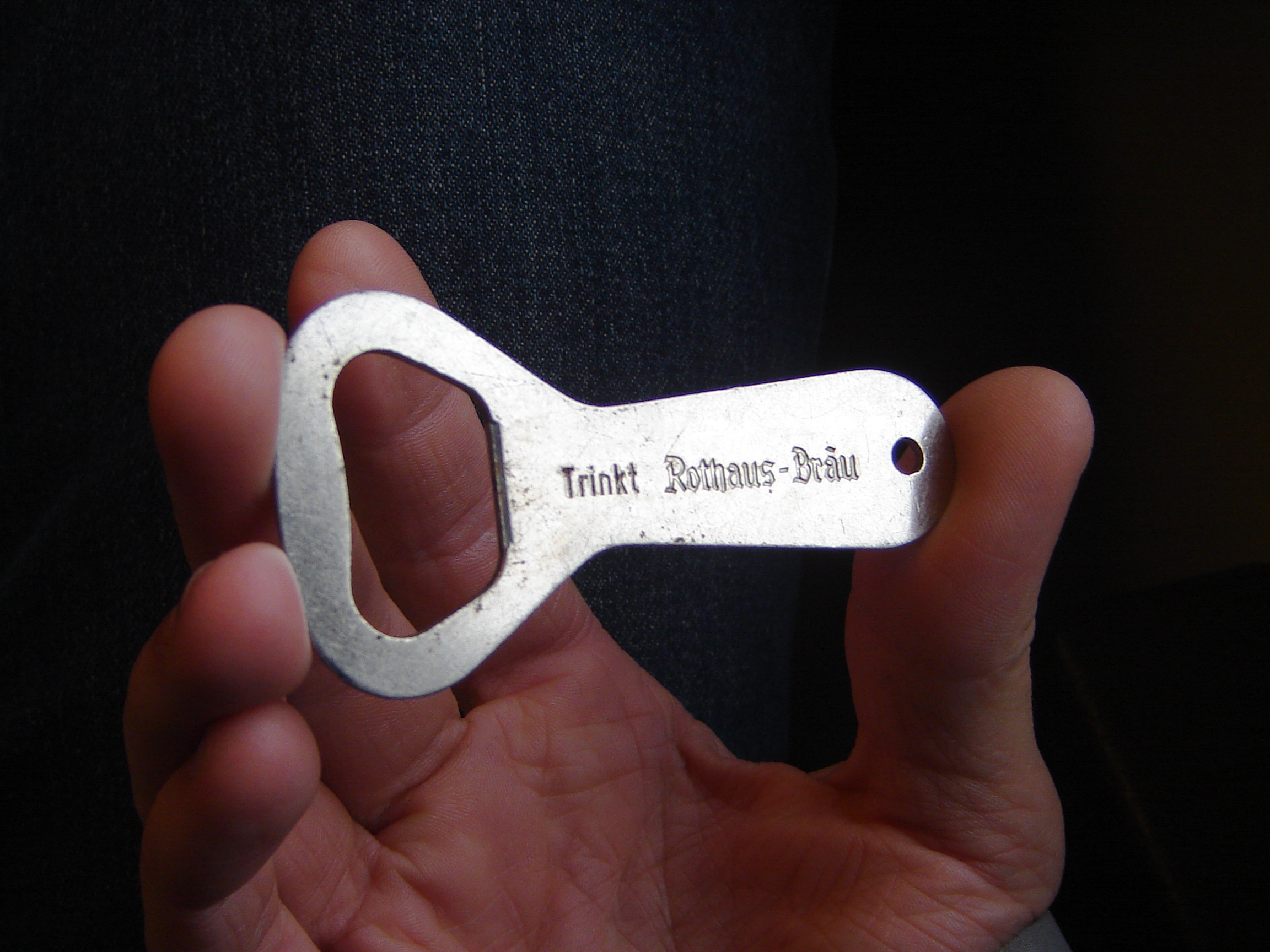
A tiny "church key" bottle opener

== Gallery ==
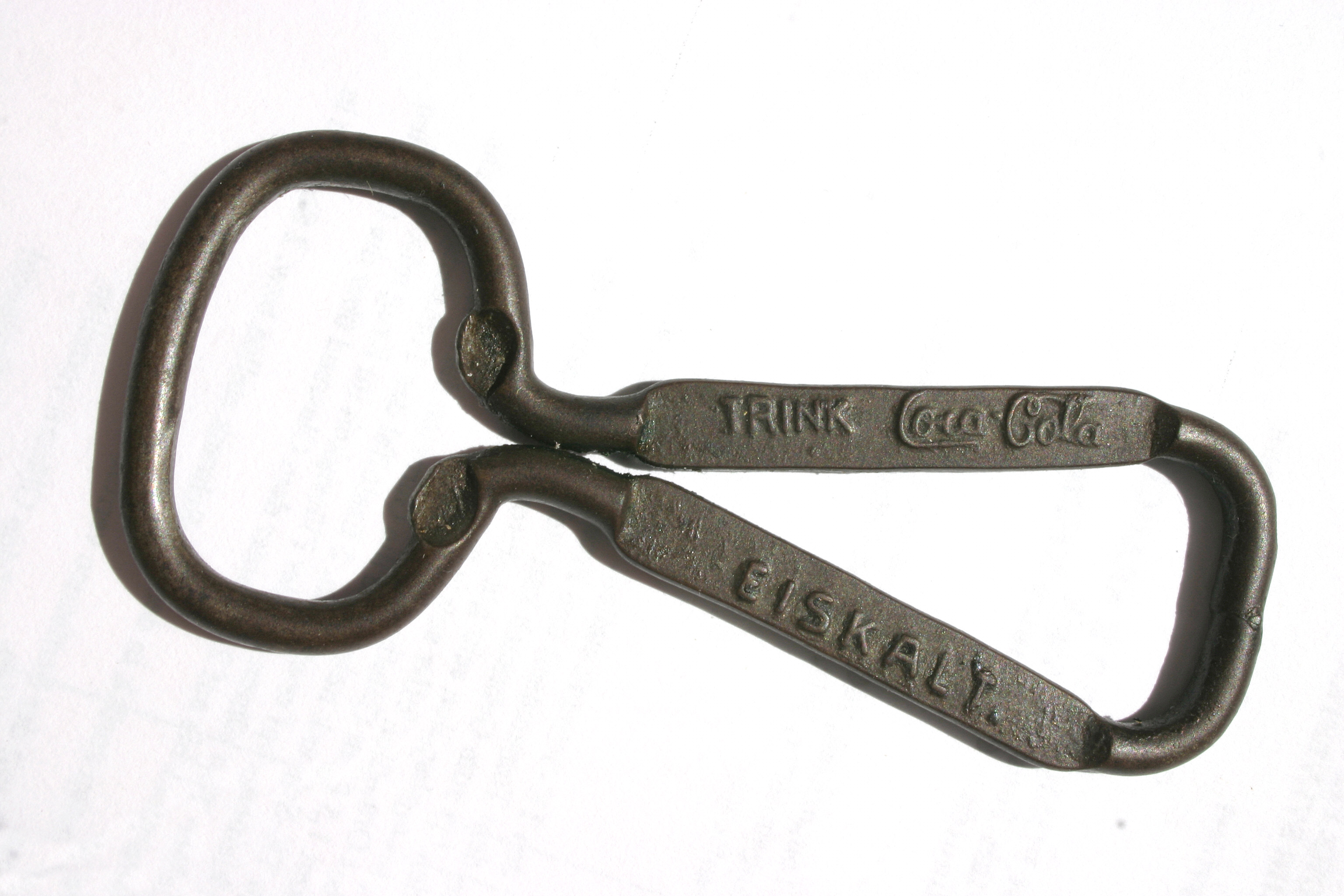
Bottle opener

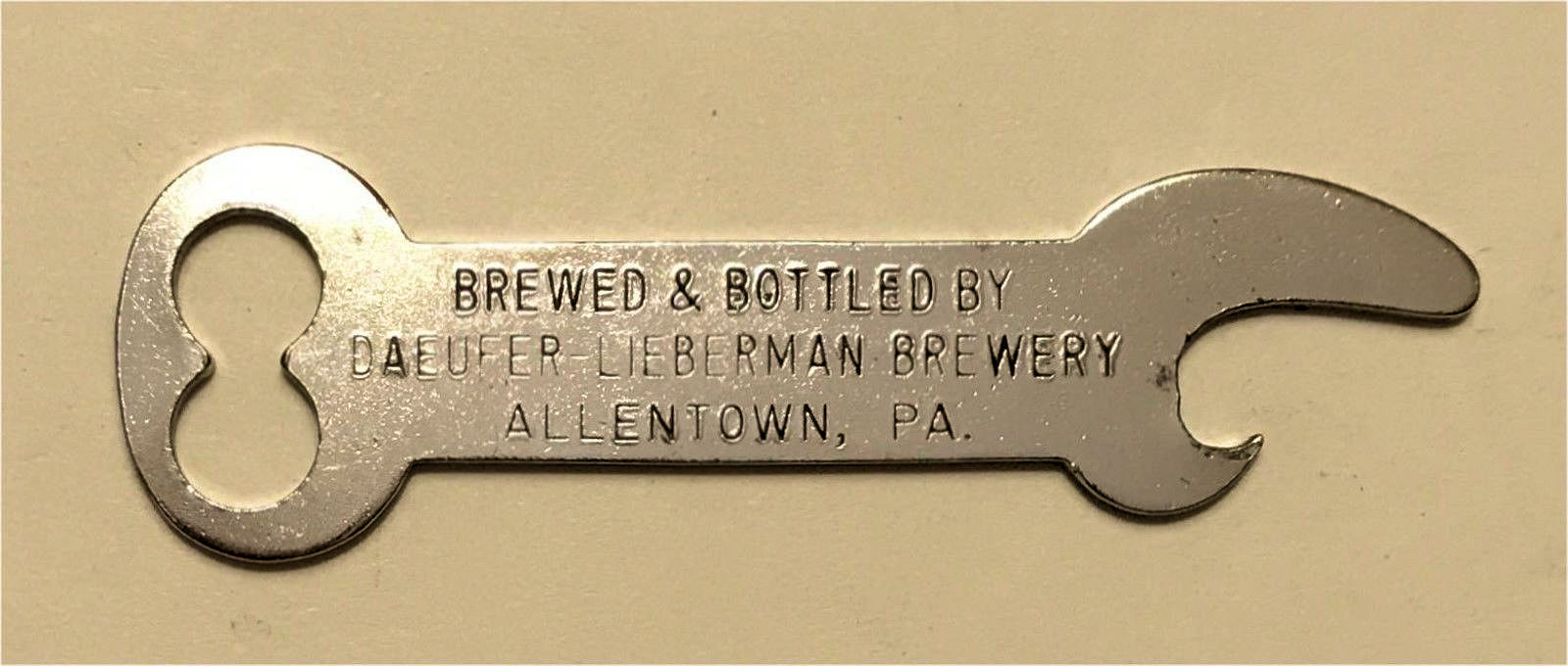
Bottle opener with advertising text - sometimes given away by shops and beverage companies as promotions

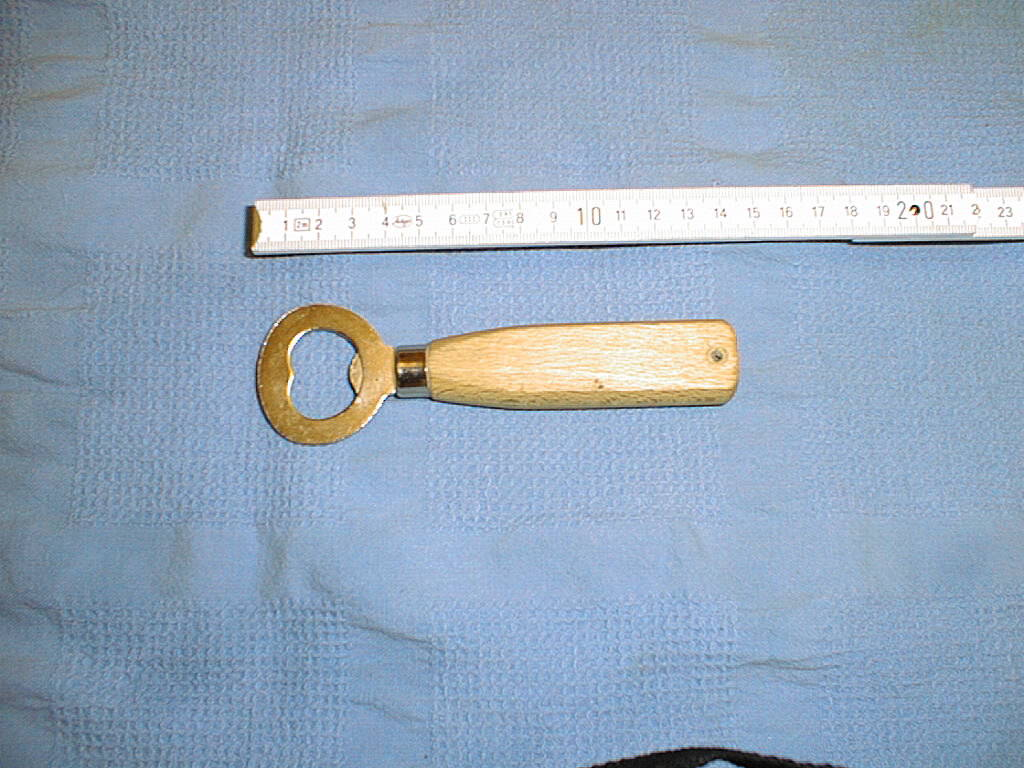
Bottle opener with wooden handle

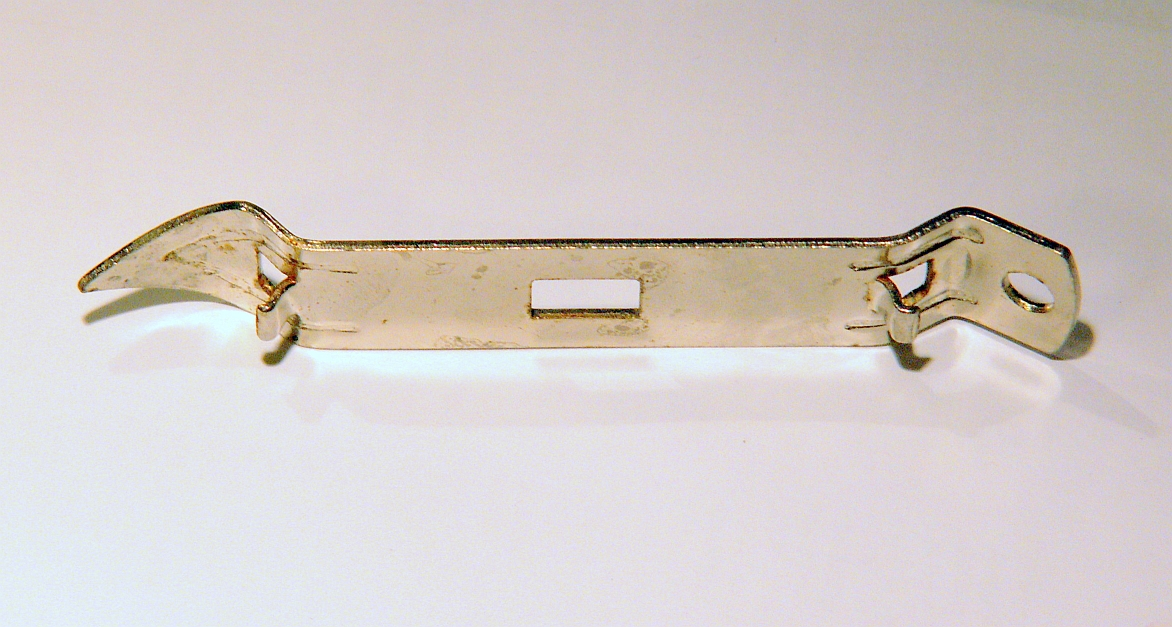
Combination can (left end) and bottle (right end) opener, very common variety for decades

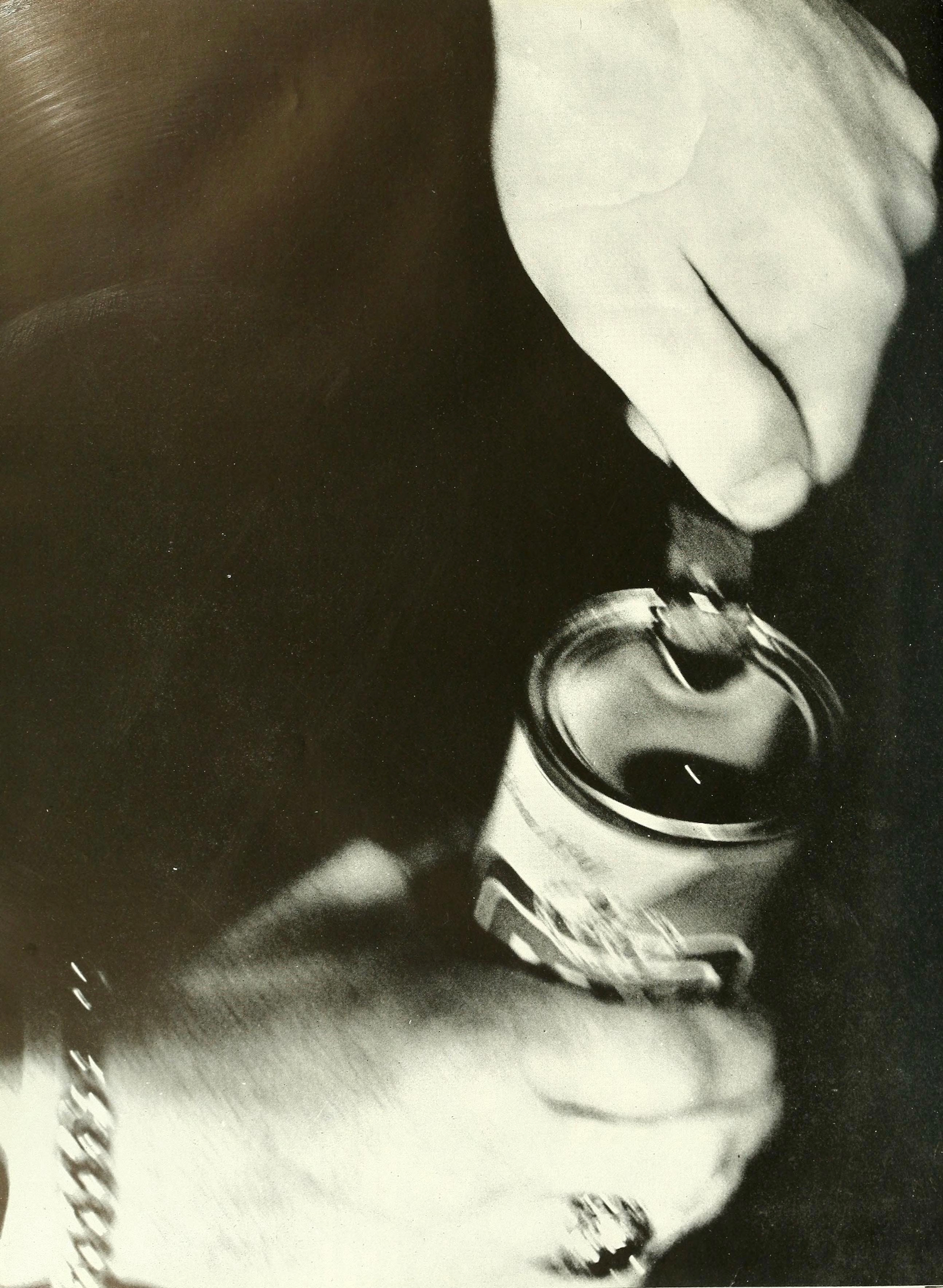
Opening a beer can with a "church key", 1963

== See also ==
- Churchkey Can Company
- Beverage opener
