= Jeffrey Elman =

American linguist (1948–2018)

Jeffrey Locke Elman (January 22, 1948 – June 28, 2018) was an American psycholinguist and professor of cognitive science at the University of California, San Diego (UCSD). He specialized in the field of neural networks.

In 1990, he introduced the simple recurrent neural network (SRNN), also known as the 'Elman network', which is capable of processing sequentially ordered stimuli, and has since become widely used.

Elman's work was highly significant to our understanding of how languages are acquired and also, once acquired, how sentences are comprehended. Sentences in natural languages are composed of sequences of words that are organized in phrases and hierarchical structures. The Elman network provides an important hypothesis for how such structures might be learned and processed.

== Early life ==
Elman attended Palisades High School in Pacific Palisades, California, then Harvard University, where he graduated in 1969. He received his Ph.D. from the University of Texas at Austin in 1977.

== Career ==
With Jay McClelland, Elman developed the TRACE model of speech perception in the mid-80s. TRACE remains a highly influential model that has stimulated a large body of empirical research.

In 1990, he introduced the simple recurrent neural network (SRNN; aka 'Elman network'), which is a widely used recurrent neural network that is capable of processing sequentially ordered stimuli. Elman nets are used in a number of fields, including cognitive science, psychology, economics and physics, among many others.

In 1996, he co-authored (with Annette Karmiloff-Smith, Elizabeth Bates, Mark H. Johnson, Domenico Parisi, and Kim Plunkett), the book Rethinking Innateness, which argues against a strong nativist (innate) view of development.

Elman was an Inaugural Fellow of the Cognitive Science Society, and also was its president, from 1999 to 2000. He was awarded an honorary doctorate from the New Bulgarian University, and was the 2007 recipient of the David E. Rumelhart Prize for Theoretical Contributions to Cognitive Science. He was founding co-director of the Kavli Institute for Brain and Mind at UC San Diego, and held the Chancellor's Associates Endowed Chair. He was Dean of Social Sciences at UCSD from 2008 until June 2014. Elman was also a founding co-director of the UCSD Halıcıoğlu Data Science Institute, announced March 1, 2018.

In 2009, Elman sent a letter to UCSD sociology professor Richard Biernacki, instructing him not to publish research which was critical of one of his colleagues at UCSD, and of other scholars in the field. Elman's letter suggested that Biernacki's criticism of the UCSD colleague constituted "harassment" and threatened Biernacki with censure, salary reduction or dismissal if he tried to publish his work. In addition, the letter threatened Biernacki with termination were he to request data from the National Science Foundation. The Committee on Academic Freedom of the UCSD Academic Senate initiated an investigation of the letter. In May 2011, after hearing a report from the committee, the UCSD faculty senate expressed "grave concern" about the incident, which it deemed a violation of academic freedom. The committee called on the administration to acknowledge and correct the situation.

== Death ==
Elman died of a heart condition on June 28, 2018, at the age of 70.
