= Churchkey Can Company =

Defunct brewery from Seattle, US

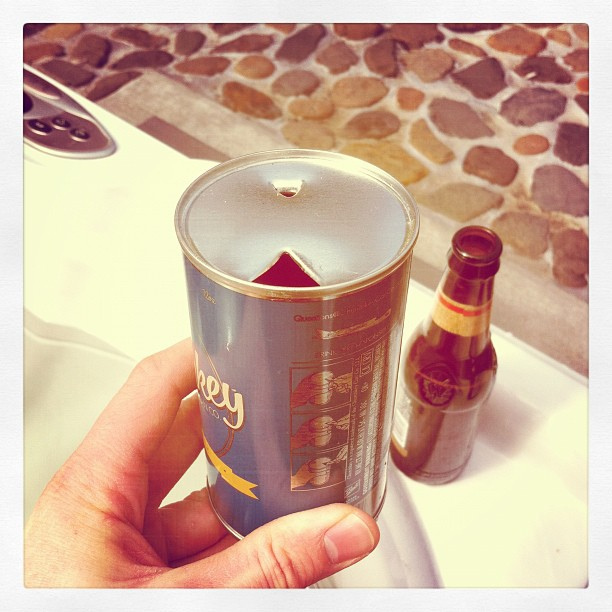
- An opened Churchkey Pilsner can (foreground)
- Location: SoDo, Seattle, Washington, US
- Coordinates: 47°33′36.95″N 122°20′16.21″W
- Opened: 2012
- Owned by: Adrian Grenier; Justin Hawkins
- Website: Official website (2016 archive)

The Churchkey Can Company was a brewery founded in 2012 by actor Adrian Grenier and former Nike designer Justin Hawkins in Seattle, US. The brewery's name refers to its flagship beer, which must be opened using a can piercer, or "church key".

== Brewery history ==
Based in the SoDo neighborhood in Seattle, Washington, the brewery is the brainchild of Hawkins and Grenier, the latter being better known for starring in Entourage. The pair met in 2010 in Portland, Oregon, and the recipe for the beer was created by two local homebrewers. Unusual for a microbrewery, some of the funding for the company came from technology investors.

In 2013, the company halted production due to quality issues caused by excessive pressure inside the cans. Production resumed in 2014 after a change to a more traditional 12-ounce aluminum, albeit still lacking the pop top.

== Churchkey beer ==
The brewery's only beer was a Pilsner-style lager with 29 IBUs and 4.9 percent ABV. It is packaged in a 12-ounce steel can made by Ball Corporation that is designed to be recyclable, as is the churchkey that is included with purchasing a six-pack. At first the beer was only available in the Seattle and Portland metropolitan areas, but had expanded to Los Angeles by 2015. As of June 2018, the company was listed as "Out of Business" by Pitchbook, a website that tracks start-up valuations.

From their introduction in the 1930s up until the 1960s, most beer cans were made of steel and had a flat top into which one needed to punch one or two holes with a can piercer, euphemistically called a "churchkey". With the advent of the "pop-top" aluminum can, this type of beverage can has disappeared almost entirely. The reception for Churchkey's retro style can has not been entirely positive, with some beer enthusiasts dubbing it "the most hipster beer in the world".

== See also ==
- Beer in the United States
