= Visual selective attention in dementia =

Visual selective attention is a brain function that controls the processing of retinal input based on whether it is relevant or important. It selects particular representations to enter perceptual awareness and therefore guide behaviour. Through this process, less relevant information is suppressed.

Visual selective attention is an essential factor in producing efficient, goal directed behaviour. Our processing resources as humans are limited, and it is therefore crucial to be able to distinguish important information in an environment which produces vast amounts of sensory input every second. In order to guide behaviour, only a small amount of that sensory input can be allowed to reach perceptual awareness. Therefore, to operate efficiently, this goal directed behaviour is mediated by visual selective attention. This allows us to selectively focus on and attend to specific information that is important or relevant to the situation or context we are in. This information then gains access to further processing, where it aids goal directed behaviour through enhancing the representation of salient and relevant stimuli, and suppressing distracting stimuli which are less relevant. The processing of distracting stimuli may interfere with the implementation of the intended behaviour.

Visual selective attention is the processes that is involved in detecting one source of sensory information over another, therefore ignoring or disregarding other sources available in the present environment. It requires many underlying cognitive processes, including detection of important sensory/perceptual information, the ability to inhibit information that is irrelevant to the task, and the ability to shift attention from one feature or location to another.

In neurodegenerative diseases such as Alzheimer's disease, dementia with Lewy bodies, and Parkinson's disease, areas such as the basal ganglia, cerebral cortex, locus coeruleus, temporal, parietal and frontal lobes, and the limbic system, especially the hippocampus and amygdala, are impaired. These areas are involved in executive functions, including memory and attention, especially visual selective attention, and therefore deficits in these abilities arise. This can result in an individual's inability to efficiently ignore distractor information when attending to specific stimuli.

== Visual selective attention and normal aging ==
Loss in the ability to efficiently ignore distractor information increases with age. This is due to age-related deficits in selective attention and working memory, particularly with regard to a reduced ability to inhibit distracting sensory information. In a study by Kotary and Hoyer, adult age differences were examined in terms of the effects of distractor interference on visual search. Distractors were either related or unrelated to the target stimuli, which was a letter Q. Young and older adults completed a target-counting task which required a search of a visual display. The number of distractor items remained constant throughout the displays, but the distractor type (i.e. whether it was categorically related to the target, numerically related, or not related at all) was varied in order to observe possible differences performance to do with age.

Researchers found that older adults were slower at counting targets than younger adults, regardless of distractor presence in the display. Counting performance slowed for both young and older adults when distractors appeared in the display, and when distractors were incongruent with regards to the required response, interference was highest for both young and older adults.

With regards to selective attention performance, no evidence suggested that there was an age difference in the effects of the type of distractor. The lack of interaction between age and condition suggests an age-related deficit in inhibitory processes, and this can be seen in the increased response times in the experimental conditions in which targets were presented without distractors, compared to targets presented with distractors. This increase in response time is greater for older adults than for younger adults, suggesting that attention allocation over trials is sensitive to age-related decline, and therefore it is possible that there is an age-related decline in ability to switch between a situation that requires the use of inhibitory processes and situations that do not require selective attention.

== Mild cognitive impairment ==
Mild cognitive impairment (MCI) is considered the transitional stage between normal aging and Alzheimer's disease, though it is noted that not all individuals diagnosed with MCI progress to dementia. It is possible that there would be some small changes in visual selective attention at this stage, as even in early stages of Alzheimer's disease, such deficits are observed.

Deficits in MCI are consistent with the neurological changes seen in brain areas such as the prefrontal cortex, parietal lobes, cholinergic system, and the decreased connectivity in the frontoparietal network in the early stages of AD. These changes, which have been shown to result in inefficient processing speed and difficulties in shifting focus, suggest that patients with MCI have more difficulty attending to the target stimuli when distractors are present, compared to healthy controls.

Individuals with MCI who progressed to dementia within 2.5 years showed significantly more inefficient visual search performance compared to those with MCI who did not progress to dementia in the same time period. It has also been suggested that deficits in visual selective attention in MCI patients appears to be dependent on task characteristics, requirements, and the type and availability of the cue. These findings are also consistent with neuropathological changes seen in early AD patients in areas such as the cholinergic system, and prefrontal and parietal regions. When the given task requires working memory, deficits in visual selective attention and performance are observed in MCI patients, however, it is noted that controlled processing are generally unaffected.

Auditory cues to aid visual selective attention in tasks were shown to improve performance, due to reduction in demand, and it is therefore apparently that MCI patients rely on exogenous information to aid in attention allocation.

== Alzheimer's disease ==
Alzheimer's disease is the most common form of dementia, which approximately two thirds of individuals with dementia are diagnosed with. It is the major cause of dementia in older adults. AD has an insidious onset with worsening prognosis, and results in deterioration in memory, spatial abilities, language, and many other cognitive functions, including visual selective attention.

Alzheimer's disease damages and kills brain cells. Compared to a healthy brain, the brain of someone with Alzheimer's has fewer cells and there are fewer connections among surviving cells. This inevitably leads to brain shrinkage. This disease characterises two types of abnormalities: plaques and tangles. Plaques are clumps of a protein called beta-amyloid. They may damage and destroy brain cells by interfering with cell-to-cell communication, among others. The collection of beta-amyloid on the outside of brain cells is thought to be implicated in the cause of this disease. Tangles are threads of another protein, tau. Tau twist into abnormal tangles inside brain cells, resulting in failure of the transport system, which is also implicated in the death of brain cells. The brain relies on this internal support and transport system in order to carry nutrients and essential materials, requiring the normal structure and functioning of tau.

Alzheimer's disease brain shrinkage

It has been suggested that attentional decline in mild AD is perhaps contingent on degeneration in the cerebral network for attention. This network includes the occipital lobe, adjacent temporal and parietal areas, frontal lobe, and subcortical regions. As the disease progresses, the prefrontal cortex begins to degenerate, and lower SAS systems lose their autonomic features.

Visual selective attention is typically impaired in Alzheimer's disease. The ability to inhibit inappropriate responses as a component of sustained attention appears to be vulnerable in the mild stages of AD, with selective attention being the most vulnerable and resistant component of attention. Patients with AD showed deficits in tests of visual selective attention, such as Map Search and the Stroop task.

Research by Pignatti et al. found that on tasks examining visual selective attention, AD patients’ performance differed significantly from that of healthy elderly controls with longer reaction times and higher error rates, on both quantitative and qualitative levels. In a similar study involving a task in which participants were required to respond to either the detection of the target item or to discriminate between several items on the display, Rizzo et al. found that the AD showed more difficulty compared to the control group on all measures of visual selective attention, and produced more errors in responses. This suggests that mild AD patients showed impairments in terms of visual attention and processing speed, and reduced attention skills correlated strongly with cognitive deficits in specific areas, and cognitive ability as a whole. Reduced performance on attention tests could be attributed to this deficit.

Foldi et al. used a multi-target visual cancellation task to examine visual selective attention in patients with AD compared to healthy controls. Researchers found slower performance and completion times compared to those without AD, and this can be seen as a more inefficient and severe form of the attentional processes found in normal aging. Patients with AD scored twice as long on each target or cancellation, irrespective of the type of cancellation, compared to that of the age-matched healthy controls. The control group was also found to slow their search times consistent with a speed-accuracy trade off. That is, when the similarity between targets and distractors increased, and it became more difficult to distinguish the target. However, they maintained detection accuracy with no increase in error rates. This finding suggests, in contrast to patients with AD's performance, that the control group slowed their search only to avoid responses to distractors, and therefore to avoid errors and demonstrate the speed-accuracy trade off. Patients with AD slowed their search as the similarity between target and distractor increased, however they still made more errors and missed targets. This performance did not demonstrate the speed-accuracy trade-off. This suggests that, in AD patients as opposed to healthy controls, the degree of similarity between search items affects the ability to selectively attend to relevant targets. Similar results were observed in Schaefer, where a study of visual selective attention in AD was conducted by varying the physical characteristics of a selective cancellation task.

== Dementia with Lewy bodies ==
Dementia with Lewy bodies is characterised by the formation of Lewy bodies in the cerebral cortex, substantia nigra, locus coeruleus, and components of the basal forebrain cholinergic system. Clinical features include a cortical dementia and confusion, Parkinsonism, sensitivity to neuroleptic drugs, and psychiatric manifestations such as recurrent and well-formed hallucinations, particularly in the early stages of the disease.

Because of an overlap in clinical symptoms, differentiating dementia with Lewy bodies from Alzheimer's type dementia can sometimes prove to be difficult. However, differences in attentional functioning capacities in patients have been found to distinguish these two neurodegenerative disorders. Although areas of attentional processing such as divided attention, shifting processes, or inhibition are impaired in both Alzheimer's disease and dementia with Lewy bodies (DLB), research has shown these deficits to be more prominent in DLB patients than AD patients, coinciding with impaired selective attention, particularly in the visual modality, or their ability to selectively allocate attention to specific stimuli.

Visual selective attention is typically impaired in this disease. In a study by Peters et al., individuals with AD or DLB completed a Rapid Serial Visual Presentation (RSVP) task. This RSVP paradigm involves the presentation of visual stimuli at the same location in rapid sequence. Each stimulus was presented rapidly, and the target stimulus was a different colour (shown in red) than the distractors (black). The stimulus set consisted of 24 English letters as targets (excluding I and O), and the digits 2–9 served as distractors. Results suggested that there were definite differences in terms of ability to inhibit distractor information in the attentional dynamics between AD and DLB patients and healthy controls, however, selective attention deficits are shown to be more severe in DLB patients than AD patients. Both DLB and AD patients showed a decrease in accuracy in the test. Patients with DLB were more severely impaired in visual selective attention compared to both AD patients and healthy controls.

Visual selective attention requires many underlying cognitive processes, including detection of important sensory and perceptual information, the ability to inhibit information that is irrelevant to the task, and the ability to shift attention from feature or location to another. In this study, it was found that DLB patients in this task performed markedly worse than both AD patients and healthy controls in the single-target condition. This suggests that the perceptual filtering component of selective attention is significantly impaired in DLB. Difficulties in discrimination in DLB patients for visual stimuli may be due to reduced ability to select and encode relevant or important information in the target search. DLB patients’ general slowness could have increased perceptual interference due to masking from distractors, and target selection and processing (in tasks such as the RSVP task) must be performed under time pressure.

Another study by Calderon et al. compared patients with DLB and AD to evaluate attentional and visuoperceptual abilities, executive function, and semantic and episodic memory, using specific neuropsychological tests. To test visual selective attention, a map search task was used, in which participant must identify target symbols from competing distractors. Results suggested that visual selective attention in DLB was more significantly impaired than AD, although AD patients were significantly more impaired than healthy controls. This study confirms that DLB patients have greater impairment of attentional and visuoperceptual abilities, attentional and executive tasks, and a large number of patients with DLB were unable to complete some measures of visual selective attention such as the Stroop task. It is therefore apparent that attentional processes are significantly more impaired in DLB patients than AD patients, especially in their visual selective attentional abilities.

There appears to be a global breakdown in attention of all aspects in patients with DLB, as highlighted by this study. A possible cause for this is the hypothesis that severe cholinergic deletion may be the underlying component in the attention deficit in DLB.

== Parkinson's disease ==
Parkinson's disease (PD) is characterised by degeneration of the substantia nigra within the basal ganglia and the locus coeruleus. These regions are implicated in attentional processes, particularly visual selective attention. Animal research and positron emission tomography (PET) studies have shown the role of the basal ganglia in selective attention processes, suggesting that deficits in these areas may lead to impaired attentional functions in PD patients. It is also possible that other brain regions, such as the frontal lobes or the superior colliculus, which are connected to the basal ganglia, underlies attentional deficits in PD patients. Damage to these areas may result in impairment in attentional functioning, and could be a result of deafferentation to these particular underlying areas.

PD is a progressive neurodegenerative disorder. It is associated with the degeneration of neurons in the substantia nigra and locus coeruleus. Clinical symptoms of PD include tremor at rest, rigidity, akinesia, difficulty initiating or maintaining movement, and slowed movement. One of the primary findings from various studies suggests that there are impairments in visual selective attention in PD patients. For example, PD patients show abnormal performance on the Stroop task, and impaired ability to selectively attend to targets among distractors, or to attend selectively to visual displays while simultaneously performing other tasks. The neuropathology of this disease is consistent with these attentional deficit. While not all individuals with PD also develop dementia, it is a common comorbidity and affects the same areas of visual selective attention impaired in individuals with MCI, AD, and DLB.

Visual perception encompasses several component processes, including the ability to selectively attend to a relevant stimuli while being able to effectively ignore irrelevant distractor information. This deficit in PD patients also relates to a deficit in overall attentional processes.

Degeneration of the substantia nigra is implicated in the cause of Parkinson's disease. These regions of the basal ganglia are also implicated in attentional processes, especially visual selective attention. It is therefore suggested that deficits in the basal ganglia and related regions may lead to impaired visual selective attention in these individuals.

Individuals with PD may be impaired in their ability to attend selectively for several different reasons. These patients may show deficits in their ability to inhibit the processing of the irrelevant information which is presented, therefore there are enabling the irrelevant information to interfere with their processing of the target information; or PD patients may indeed be able to inhibit the processing of the irrelevant stimuli, but showed impairments in maintaining the selectivity of their attention to the relevant stimuli, supported by an abnormally rapid disengagement of attention from the location at which a visual cue last appeared.
