= Bottle opener =

Device for removing metal caps from bottles

Demonstration of a bottle cap opener

A bottle opener or bottle cap opener is a device for removing metal bottle caps from glass bottles. More broadly, it could include corkscrews to remove cork or plastic stoppers from wine bottles.

A metal bottle cap is affixed to the rim of the neck of a bottle by being pleated or ruffled around the rim. A bottle opener is a specialized lever inserted beneath the pleated metalwork, which uses a point on the bottle cap as a fulcrum on which to pivot.

== History ==
Alfred L. Bernardin of Bernardin Bottle Cap Company (Evansville, Indiana), was the first person to apply for and receive a US patent for a bottle opener, on July 11, 1893. By convention this distinction is usually afforded to William Painter of Baltimore, the first to patent the "crown cork" bottle cap for which the bottle opener is made; in fact Bernardin beat him to it by a few months. Bernardin's design is a one-handed table-mounted opener such as for bartenders; Painter's patent, received February 6, 1894, is a hand-held design - otherwise both essentially worked the same for the same purpose.

== Varieties ==
There are several distinct designs of such bottle openers. The functional elements of bottle openers (a tooth or lip to catch the underside of the cap, a fulcrum across which to exert the force that will remove the cap, and usually a lever for mechanical advantage) tend to be consistent, although they can vary in design and aesthetics.

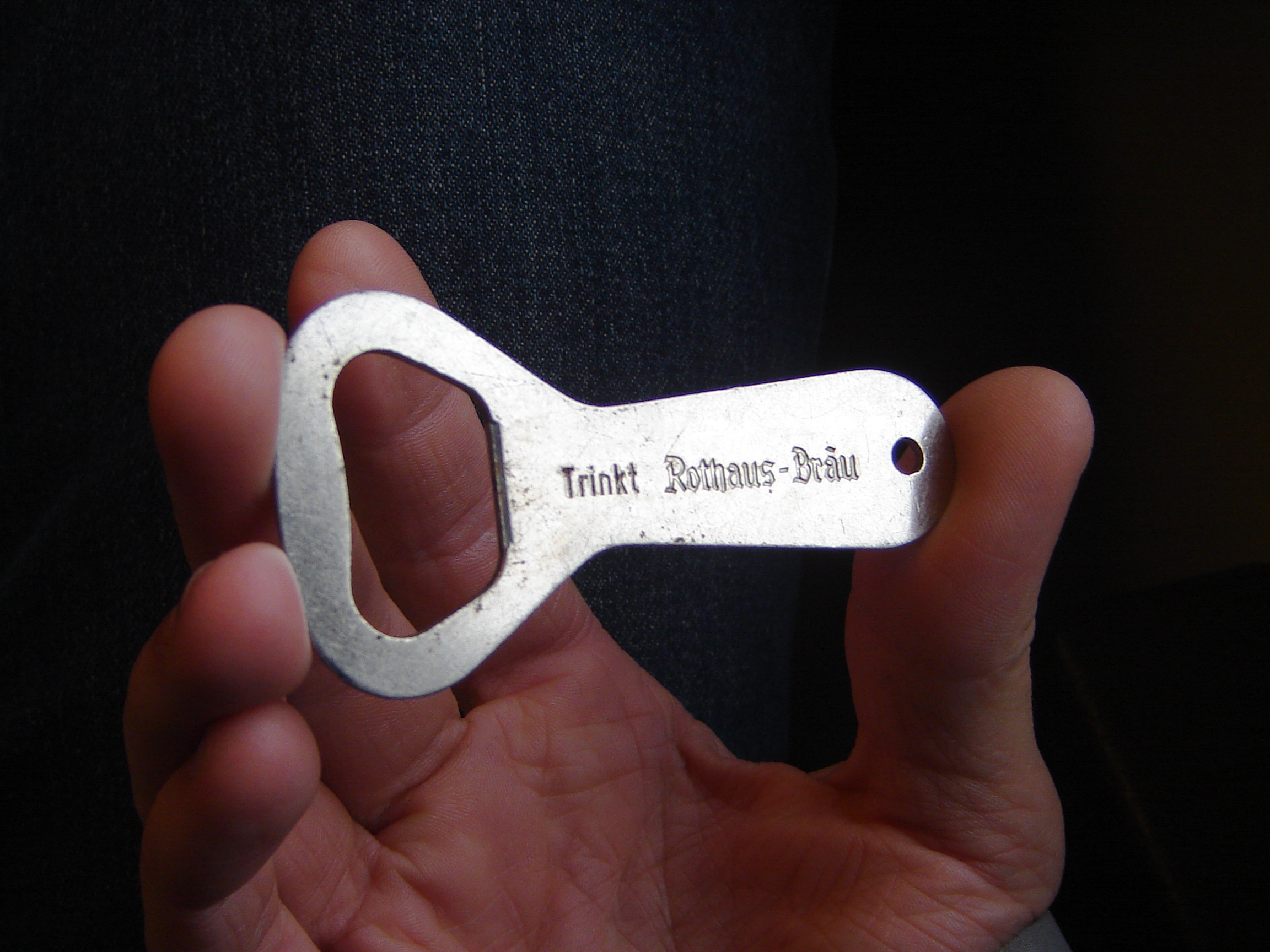
A simple bottle opener

=== Mounted ===
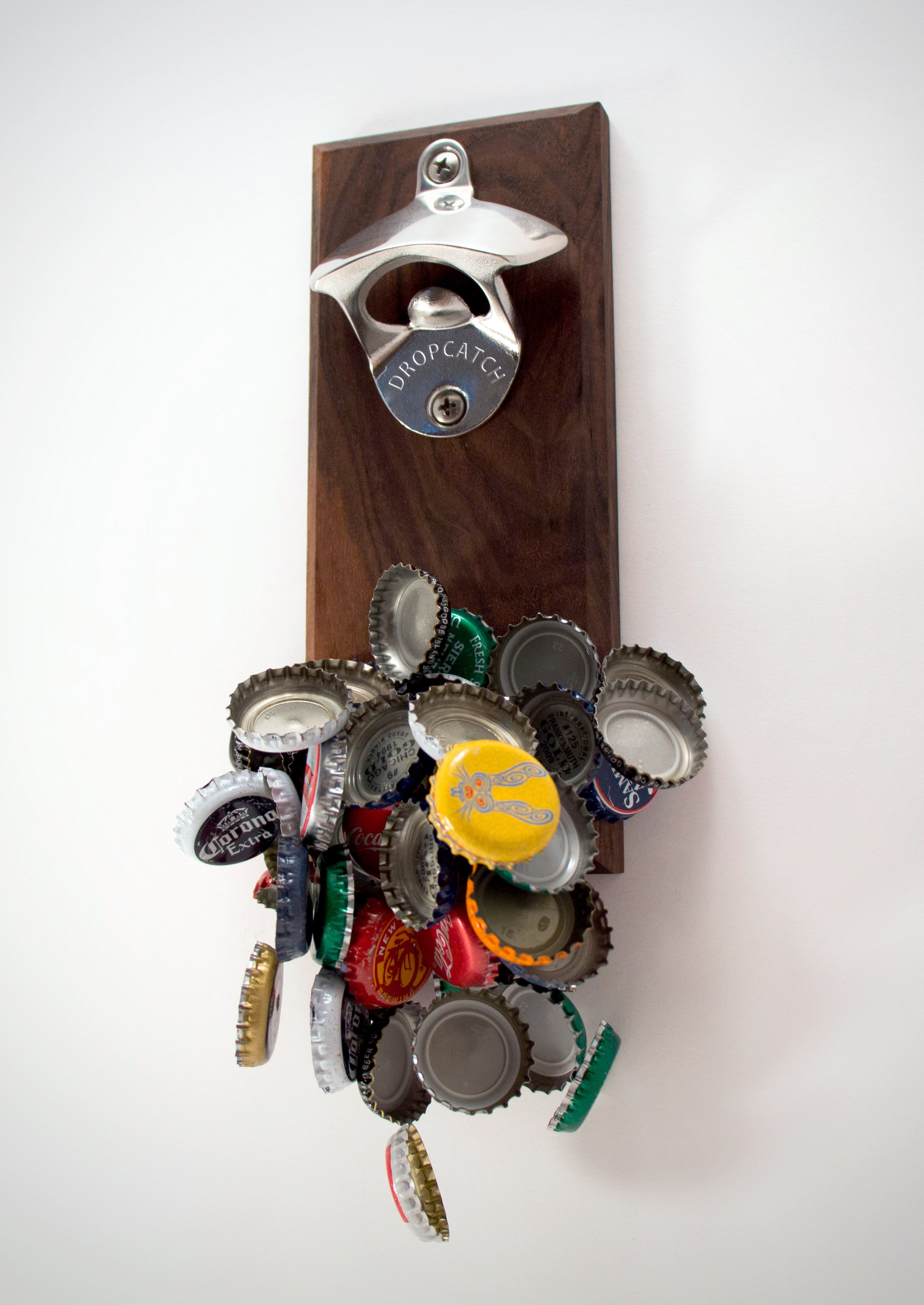
Wall-mounted bottle opener with magnet to catch lids

The first patent for a bottle opener was given in 1893, it was mounted.

A mounted bottle opener is attached to a table, bar counter, wall, etc... to allow for one-handed bottle-opening. The bottle cap can fall into a bottle cap catcher below the opener. Mounted openers were also once common on vending machines that dispensed bottled soft drinks.

=== Hand held ===
The second patent for a bottle opener was given in 1894, it was hand held.

A simple opener is a piece of metal with a rectangular or rounded opening in one end and a solid handle large enough to be gripped between the thumb and forefingers on the other. The opening contains a lip that is placed under the edge of the bottle top, pulling it off when upward force is applied to the handle end of the opener.

=== Speed opener ("bar blade") ===
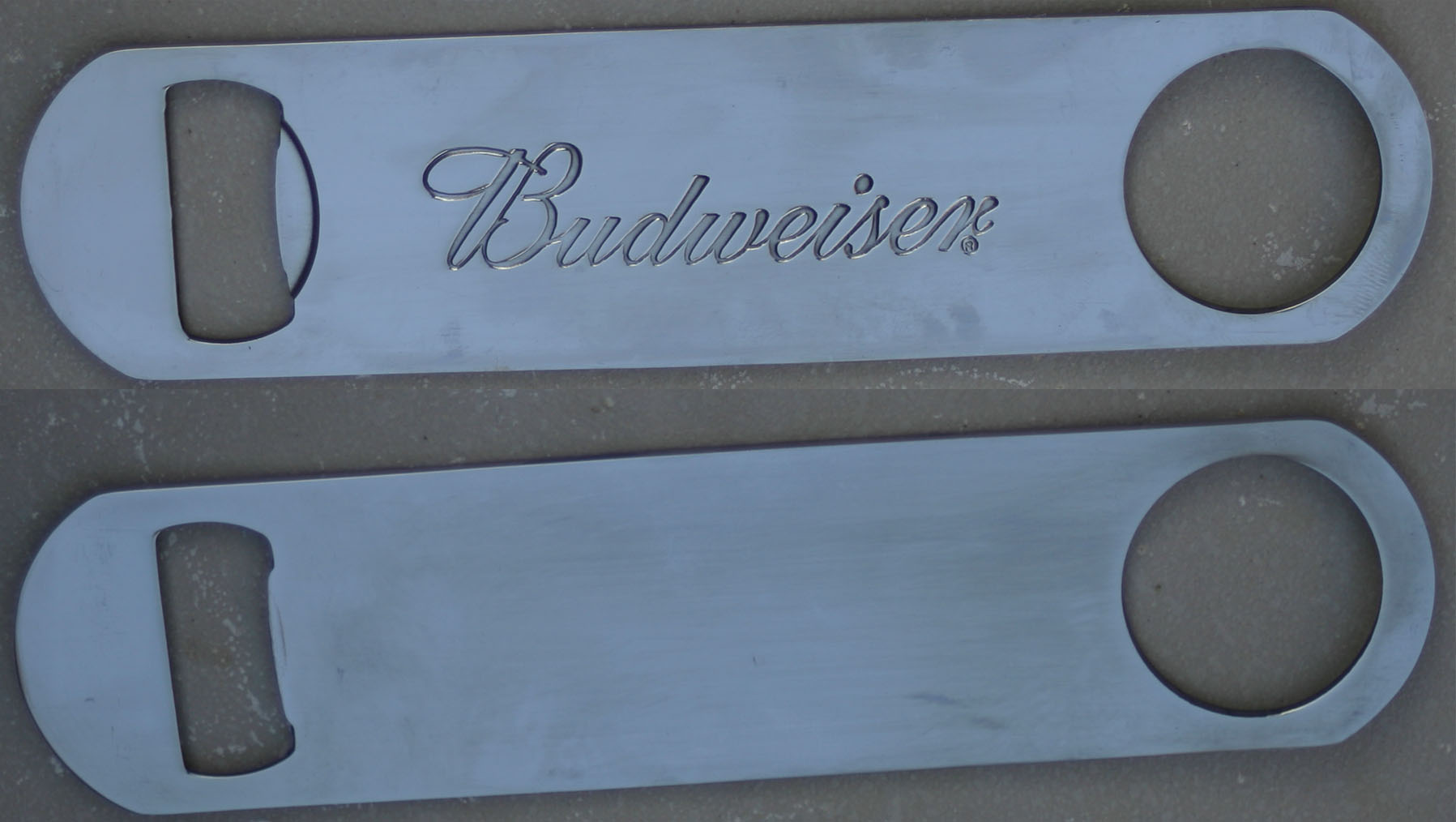
A Budweiser branded "bar blade", front and back

The speed opener is a flat blade of steel approximately 4 centimetres (1.6 in) wide and 16 centimetres (6.3 in) long with a thumb hole at one end and a letterbox cut at the other to remove the crown seals from a bottle. They go under the names "speed opener", "popper", "mamba", "bar key", and most popularly "bar blade". The thumb hole may be used to pull bottles out of ice, by placing the hole over the neck of the bottle, then lifting it. The speed opener is widely used by professional bartenders in Canada, the United States, and the UK. Carried in the pocket or against the body or on a zip string, it is both convenient and fast for the modern bartender. It is advantageous in that it is easy to open several bottles in rapid succession, and with more flair than other types of bottle opener. Consequently, "bar blading" is often part of bar flair routines.

=== Multi-opener ===
Also known as beverage openers, these usually include a bottle opener of the simple bottle opener style but also various other openers such as for plastic bottles or metal beverage cans.

== Technique ==
Under most use, a bottle opener functions as a second-class lever: the fulcrum is the far end of the bottle opener, placed on the top of the crown, with the output at the near end of the bottle opener, on the crown edge, between the fulcrum and the hand: in these cases, one pushes up on the lever.

However, one may instead use it as a first-class lever, by placing the near end on the top of the crown, and the far end under the crown edge, then pushing down on the lever (thus the output is on the opposite side of the fulcrum from the hand). This is particularly used with bar blades, which form an obtuse angle. Mechanically, this is a marginally less effective lever, as the effort arm is shorter, but the action of pushing down is marginally anatomically easier.

While most lever-type bottle openers can be used in either configuration, the designed use can be determined if one of the edges is curved, in which case this edge is designed to sit in the middle of the crown, as the curve concentrates pressure, deforming the crown, and a curved edge does not connect with as much of the crown edge, hence being suboptimal and slipping more frequently if used to connect with the crown edge. This difference can be seen in comparing the traditional opener and contemporary bar blade at right.

== Injuries ==
New Zealand has had in average 40 injuries recorded by the Accident Compensation Corporation per year due to injuries while opening a beer bottle that required to remove a metal lid. Two ophthalmologists Cam Loveridge-Easther and Sacha Moore wrote a letter recommending for warnings to be put on bottles.

== See also ==
- Jar opener
