= Elizabeth Bates =

American cognitive scientist (1947–2003)

- Born: Elizabeth Ann Bates; July 26, 1947; Wichita, Kansas, U.S.
- Died: December 13, 2003 (aged 56); San Diego, California, U.S.
- Education: Saint Louis University; University of Chicago
- Known for: Research on the cognitive, neural, and social bases of language
- Scientific career
- Fields: Language acquisition Cognitive science Cognitive neuroscience
- Workplaces: University of California, San Diego; University of Colorado

Elizabeth Ann Bates (July 26, 1947 – December 13, 2003) was an American professor of cognitive science at the University of California, San Diego. She was an internationally renowned expert and leading researcher in child language acquisition, psycholinguistics, aphasia, and the neurological bases of language, and she authored 10 books and over 200 peer-reviewed articles and book chapters on these subjects. Bates was well known for her assertion that linguistic knowledge is distributed throughout the brain and is subserved by general cognitive and neurological processes.

== Biography ==
Elizabeth Bates earned a B.A. from St. Louis University in 1968, and an M.A. and PhD in human development from the University of Chicago in 1971 and 1974, respectively.

She was employed as a tenure-track professor at the University of Colorado from 1974-1981 before joining the faculty of the University of California, San Diego, where she worked until late 2003. Bates was one of the founders of the Department of Cognitive Science at UCSD, the first department of its kind in the USA. She was also the director of the UCSD Center of Research in Language and the co-director of the San Diego State University/UCSD Joint Doctoral Program in Language and Communication Disorders. Bates also served as a visiting professor at the University of California, Berkeley in 1976-1977 and at the National Research Council Institute of Psychology in Rome.

== Death and legacy ==
On December 13, 2003, Elizabeth Bates died, after a year-long struggle with pancreatic cancer. Over the course of more than thirty years, Bates had established herself as a world leader in a number of fields – child development, language acquisition, aphasia research, cross-linguistic research, bilingualism, psycholinguistics and their neural underpinnings, and had trained, supported and collaborated with a diverse and international group of researchers and students. The Elizabeth Bates Graduate Research Fund was established at UCSD in her memory to assist graduate students' research.

== Research ==
Elizabeth Bates was a pioneer and leading scholar in studying how the brain processes language. Bates made significant contributions in the fields of child language acquisition, cross-linguistic language processing, aphasia, and investigating the cognitive, neural, and social linguistic factors subserving these processes. With Brian MacWhinney, Bates developed a model of language processing called the competition model, which views language acquisition as an emergentist phenomenon that results from competition between lexical items, phonological forms, and syntactic patterns, accounting for language processing on the synchronic, ontogenetic, and phylogenetic time scales. She was a main proponent of the functionalist view of grammar, in that communication is the main force that drives language's natural forms. This view provides support for Bates' widely known perspective: the brain does not use specialized linguistic centers, but instead employs general cognitive abilities in order to solve a communicative conundrum. Much of her research provided evidence towards the core principles of empiricism and against the nativist school of thought, which made her a major player in the East Pole-West Pole divide of cognitive psychology and cognitive neuroscience.

=== Language acquisition ===
In defense of communication functioning as a main force of language acquisition, she looked to the prelinguistic use of commands by infants that required them to develop and use social skills. She highlighted the reliance on pointing by infants in order to fill their need to communicate before they are able to speak. The child's ability to incorporate imperatives in their gestures in order to make a command or request was found in her research and shows the necessity of communication regardless of language. Bates also coined the term protoword, a word-like utterance made by prelinguistic children that has meaning (e.g. yumyum), but does not represent the adult-like form.

When discussing the time period where children begin to speak, Bates received a lot of attention for finding an overwhelming amount of nouns within the first 50 words of a native English speaker's vocabulary. Bates helped settle an ongoing debate among linguists who argued that a referential language style, characterized by the child's first 50 words containing mostly object labels, was a better strategy in developing language than a personal and socially expressive language style. She found that regardless of the strategy applied by the child, they learn words at the same rate. She did, however, find strong predictive power in the child's vocabulary at 13 and 20 months old and their grammatical complexity at 2 years old. Bates finds that language learning comes from the neural plasticity in the brain; therefore, children can and are able to learn a language, even with brain trauma.

=== Domain-Specificity, Modularity and Neural Plasticity in Language Processing ===
Bates and colleagues also showed that after brain injury, adult aphasic patients' deficits were not specific to linguistic structures theorized to be localized to specific brain areas, or even restricted to the linguistic domain. Deficits and lesion sites instead overlap in the role that they affect speech fluency and complexity. Language is viewed as interrelated with cognitive processes such as memory, pattern recognition, and spreading activation. This perspective runs counter to the theory of Noam Chomsky, Eric Lenneberg, and Steven Pinker that language is processed in a domain-specific manner, by specific language modules in the mind, and can be localized to specific brain regions such as Broca's and Wernicke's areas.

Through her research, Bates demonstrated that neural plasticity allows children with damage to the right hemisphere or the left hemisphere to learn and use language within normal range After matching for age, sex and socioeconomic status, any differences from children who did not suffer brain damage were minor. In contrast, the same study presented striking evidence that similar brain damage has much more severe and often permanent consequences on language use when incurred as an adult. In a comparative study on the Origins of Language Disorders, Bates found that the period between 0 and 5 years of age was important to the argument of neural plasticity as this suggests that reorganization in response to an injury occurs during this period. However, there are limits to brain plasticity. Despite the area that is damaged, whether it be right-frontal or left-frontal, there was an increased risk for expressive language delay within 19 months to 30 months. This suggests that left-frontal regions may be important for language production in the adult brain, but aren't likely to be a unique or innately set up to subserve language functions.

== Honors and awards ==
- Boyd R. McCandless Distinguished Young Scientist Award Division 7, American Psychological Association, 1979
- John Simon Guggenheim Memorial Fellowship, 1981
- Fellow-Elect, Center for Advanced Study in the Behavioral Sciences, 1983
- Honorary René Descartes Doctorate, University of Paris, 1992
- Honorary Doctorate, New Bulgarian University, Sofia, Bulgaria, 1997

== Selected publications ==
- Elizabeth Bates and the Search for the Roots of Human Language www.lostwomenofscience.org: https://www.lostwomenofscience.org/podcast-episodes/elizabeth-bates-and-the-search-for-the-roots-of-human-language
- Bates, E (1976). "Language and Context: The acquisition of pragmatics": https://archive.org/details/languagecontexta0000bate/page/n5/mode/2up
- Volterra, Virginia (July 2004) "Tribute to Elizabeth Bates": https://www.researchgate.net/publication/8450973_Tribute_to_Elizabeth_Bates
- Beyond nature-nurture : essays in honor of Elizabeth Bates. Internet Archive. Mahwah, N.J. : Lawrence Erlbaum Associates, Publishers. 2005. ISBN 978-0-8058-5027-7: https://archive.org/details/beyondnaturenurt0000unse/page/n19/mode/2up“Elizabeth Bates" crl.ucsd.edu: https://crl.ucsd.edu/bates/
- Blakeslee, Sandra (2003-12-17). "Elizabeth Bates, 56, Researcher on the Development of Language." The New York Times: https://www.nytimes.com/2003/12/17/us/elizabeth-bates-56-researcher-on-the-development-of-language.html
- Dick, Frederic, Elman, Jeffery, and Stiles, Joan (2004). "Elizabeth Bates: A scientific obituary." Cognitive Science Online: https://cogsci-online.ucsd.edu/column_archive/CSO2-1-obituary.pdf

== Additional sources ==
- Karmiloff-Smith, A (2004). "Editorial obituary: Elizabeth Bates (1947–2003)". Language and Cognitive Processes. 19 (2): 177–179. doi:10.1080/01690960444000025. S2CID 144337898.
- Li, P., Tan, L. & Tzeng, O. J. L. (2005). Epilogue: A tribute to Elizabeth Bates. In P. Li, L.-H. Tan, E. Bates & O. Tzeng (eds.), Handbook of East Asia psycholinguistics, vol. 1: Chinese. Cambridge: Cambridge University Press.
- Tomasello, M. & Slobin, D. I. (2004). Beyond nature–nurture: Essays in honor of Elizabeth Bates. Mahwah, NJ: Erlbaum.
