= Letitia Naigles =

American developmental psychologist

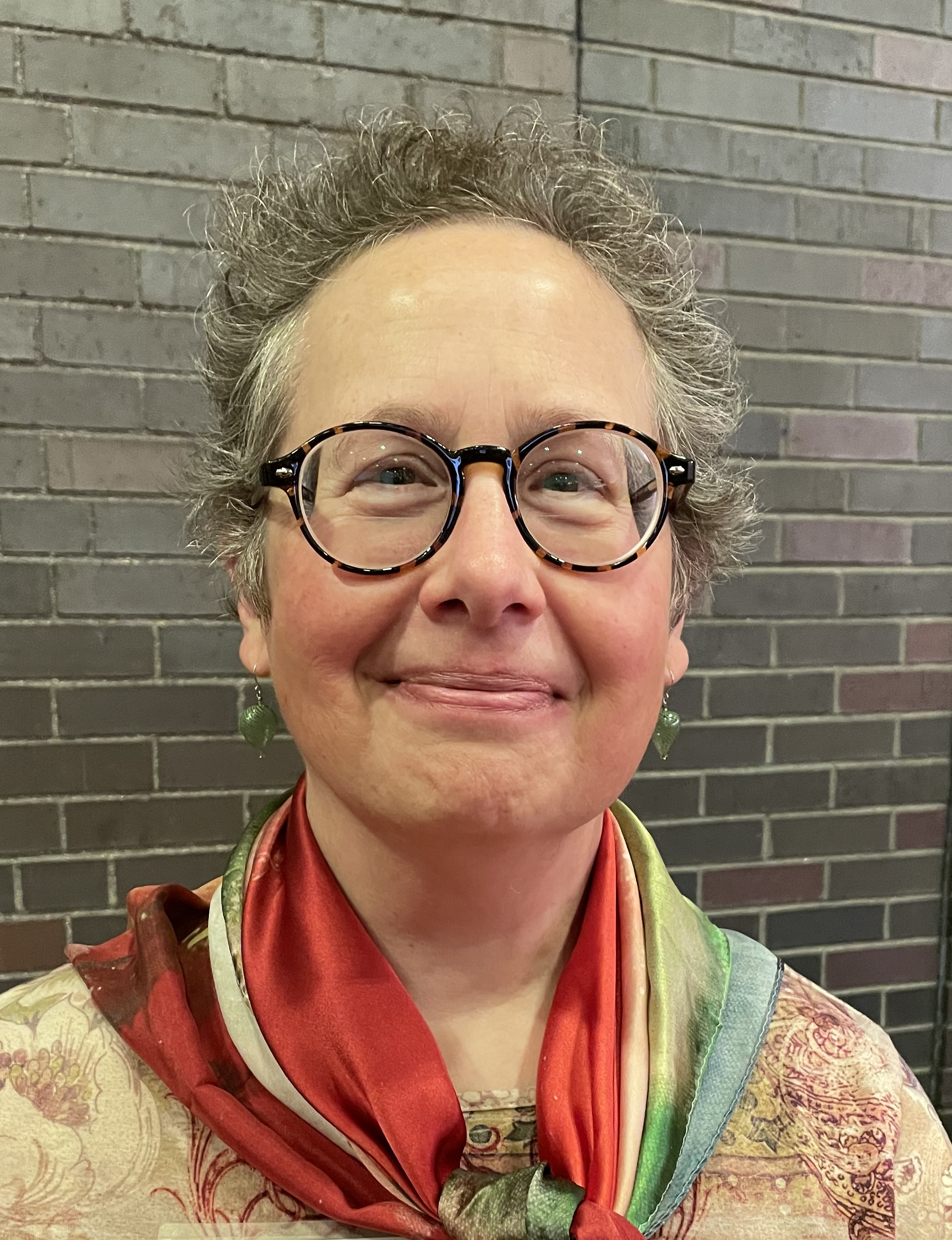
- Citizenship: United States of America
- Occupation: Professor of Psychological Sciences
- Spouse: Mark Naigles (1960-2021)
- Awards: UConn AAUP Excellence Award for Research & Creativity: Career (2019); UConn CLAS Award for Excellence in Research for the Behavioral and Life Sciences (2017)

Academic background
- Education: University of Pennsylvania (Psychology, M.A. 1984; Ph.D. 1988); Brown University (Cognitive Science, B.A. 1983)
- Alma mater: University of Pennsylvania

Academic work
- Discipline: Psychological Sciences
- Institutions: University of Connecticut

Letitia Rose Gewirth Naigles is a developmental psychologist known for her contributions to the field of language acquisition, including work on syntactic bootstrapping and language development trajectories of children with autism. She is Professor of Psychological Sciences at the University of Connecticut and the director of the UConn Child Language Lab.

Naigles has served as Vice President of the International Association for the Study of Child Language (IASCL), and as Conference Liaison to the 2027 Congress. She is a member of the Editorial Board of the Journal of Child Language.

In 2017, Naigles was awarded the University of Connecticut College of Liberal Arts and Sciences Excellence in Research Award for the Biological and Life Sciences. In 2019, she received the Research Excellence: Career Award from the University of Connecticut chapter of the American Association of University Professors.

== Biography ==
Letitia R. Gewirth received her B.A. in cognitive science from Brown University in 1983. As an undergraduate, Gewirth co-authored two research papers: "Altered patterns of word associations in dementia and aphasia" in Brain and Language, and "A Reconsideration of acoustic Invariance for place of articulation" in The Journal of the Acoustical Society of America. She was mentored by Aditi Lahiri and Sheila E Blumstein.

Naigles completed her M.A. and later her Ph.D. in psychology at the University of Pennsylvania in 1988. She defended her dissertation on "Syntactic bootstrapping as a procedure for verb learning" in 1988 under the guidance of Lila Gleitman. In her thesis, she argued that young children use syntactic structure as clues the meaning of the words, especially verbs.

Naigles joined the faculty of the Department of Psychology at Yale University where she was Assistant Professor from 1988 to1994, and later Associate Professor from 1994 to 1998. At Yale, Naigles was the advisor of the Philosophy track of undergraduate Psychology major, Trumbull College, and Mellon Minority Student Research Program. In 1998, Naigles moved to the University of Connecticut. She has been a Visiting Professor at Koc University (2004–2005), and at the MIND Institute (2013).

Naigles has been a guest columnist of the newsletter CCSTSG (Central Connecticut Star Trek Support Group) Enterprises. She was mentioned in a NYTimes article "Analyzing Culture Though Star Trek" in reference to using Star Trek episodes to draw analogies about language and development in her psychology classes.

Naigles met her husband Mark as an undergraduate at Brown University. They were married from 1984 until he died in 2021. Mark Naigles was a lecturer of mathematics at the University of Connecticut.

== Research ==
Naigles's doctoral research on syntactic bootstrapping investigated how children use syntactic structure as cues to verb meaning. In experiments 1 and 2, she asked children to use toys to convey the meanings of verbs in grammatically correct and incorrect sentences. She found that children as young as 30 months could use syntactic structure to adapt familiar word meanings. In experiments 3 and 4, she used the preferential looking paradigm where she presented children with sentences such as "The bunny is gorping the duck" (transitive) and "The bunny and the duck are gorping" (intransitive). In both examples, the child could guess the meaning of the verbs by using the videos and associated syntactic structure as cues. Naigles has conducted research on the phenomenon of syntactic bootstrapping in different languages, including French, Mandarin Chinese, Turkish, Korean, Spanish, and Japanese. Her work has encompassed a diverse range of participants, including children ranging in age from 2 to 12 years and adults.

Around 2002, Naigles began shifting her research focus to language and cognitive development in children with autism, Naigles has directed several intensive longitudinal investigations of language development in children with autism. She has focused on the children’s comprehension of language, using the preferential looking paradigm, and documented much more advanced understanding than is evident in what the children say, during early development. Naigles has also explored how language difficulties may be related to social challenges in autism. One of her interests has been children's pronoun reversal errors, which occur when a child says "you" instead of "I" to refer to themself. Unlike common nouns, pronouns may be confusing to children learning language. For example, a mother might call herself "mom", or "I", or "me" on different occasions, making it difficult for the child to distinguish their meanings. Naigles and her colleagues demonstrated that while pronoun reversals may be more common in children with autism, they were actually extremely rare in regular conversations, and were related to aspects of their social development.

In addition to her research on language acquisition, Naigles has been involved in social justice work. She and her colleague Bede Agocha were awarded a UConn grant in 2020 to support work on anti-racist teaching. In collaboration with the Africana Studies Institute and the Cognitive Science Program, Naigles worked on the creation of a social-justice-focused undergraduate course, titled "Language and Racism" which discussed African-American English among other language variants. The project aimed to help people understand how racism may be perpetuated through language and communication.

== Books and monographs ==
- Bavin, E. L. & Naigles, L. R. (Eds.) (2015). The Cambridge Handbook of Child Language. Cambridge University Press.
- Naigles, L. R. (Ed.) (2017). Innovative Investigations of Language in Autism Spectrum Disorder. American Psychological Association / De Gruyter Mouton. https://doi.org/10.1515/9783110409871
- Naigles, L. R., Hoff, E. & Vear, D. (2009). Flexibility in early verb use: Evidence from a multiple-N diary study. Monographs of the Society for Research in Child Development, 74(2), vii-112. https://doi.org/10.1111/j.1540-5834.2009.00513.x PMID 19660058

== Other representative publications ==
- Gewirth, L. R., Shindler, A. G., & Hier, D. B. (1984). Altered patterns of word associations in dementia and aphasia. Brain and Language, 21(2), 307-317. https://doi.org/10.1016/0093-934X(84)90054-3
- Lahiri, A., Gewirth, L., & Blumstein, S. E. (1984). A reconsideration of acoustic invariance for place of articulation in diffuse stop consonants: Evidence from a cross‐language study. The Journal of the Acoustical Society of America, 76(2), 391-404. https://doi.org/10.1121/1.391580
- Naigles, L., Cheng, M., Xu Rattasone, N., Tek, S., Khetrapal, N., Fein, D., & Demuth, K. (2016) “You’re telling me!” Prevalence and predictors of pronoun reversals in children with ASD and typical development. Research in Autism Spectrum Disorders, 27, 11-20. https://doi.org/10.1016/j.rasd.2016.03.008
- Naigles, L. R. (1996). The use of multiple frames in verb learning via syntactic bootstrapping. Cognition, 58(2), 221-251. https://doi.org/10.1016/0010-0277(95)00681-8
- Naigles, L. R. (2002). Form is easy, meaning is hard: Resolving a paradox in early child language. Cognition, 86(2), 157-199. https://doi.org/10.1016/S0010-0277(02)00177-4
