= Susan Goldin-Meadow =

American psychologist

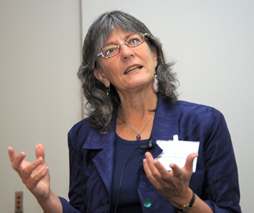
- Susan Goldin-Meadow in 2009
- Education: B.A., Smith College;, Ph.D., University of Pennsylvania
- Known for: homesign, languages that are created by children who lack linguistic input; how our own gestures help us think and learn
- Awards: John Simon Guggenheim Fellowship, James McKeen Cattell Fellowship, Mentor Award (American Psychological Association, Division 7), Fellow of the American Academy of Arts and Science, Rumelhart Prize in Cognitive Science
- Scientific career
- Fields: Language development, Cognitive development
- Workplaces: University of Chicago
- Academic advisors: Rochel Gelman, Lila Gleitman

Susan Goldin-Meadow is the Beardsley Ruml Distinguished Service Professor in the Departments of Psychology, Comparative Human Development, the college, and the Committee on Education at the University of Chicago. She is the principal investigator of a 10-year program project grant, funded by the National Institute of Child Health and Human Development, designed to explore the impact of environmental and biological variation on language growth. She is also a co-PI of the Spatial Intelligence and Learning Center (SILC), one of six Science of Learning Centers funded by the National Science Foundation to explore learning in an interdisciplinary framework with an eye toward theory and application. She is the founding editor of Language Learning and Development, the official journal of the Society for Language Development. She was President of the International Society for Gesture Studies from 2007–2012.

== Background ==
Goldin-Meadow got her Ph.D. in developmental psychology from the University of Pennsylvania where she studied with Rochel Gelman and Lila Gleitman. Before coming to Penn and while an undergraduate at Smith College, she spent a year at the Piagetian Institute in Geneva, where she conducted research with Barbel Inhelder and Hermine Sinclair and took courses with Jean Piaget. After Penn, she moved to the University of Chicago.

In addition to serving as the editor of Language Learning and Development for eight years, Goldin-Meadow was an Associate Editor of Developmental Psychology, Cognitive Science, and the journal Gesture. She has also served as president of the Society for Cognitive Development and the International Society for Gesture Studies and is the chair-elect for the Cognitive Science Society. She was the chair of the Section on Linguistics and Language Sciences for the AAAS, and a member-at-large of the Psychology Section and the Linguistics and Language Science Section of the AAAS. She has served a member of the Governing Board of the Cognitive Science Society and the board of directors of the Association for Psychological Science. She is currently a member of the Foundation Board of the Federation of Associations in Behavioral and Brain Sciences (FABBS).

Goldin-Meadow served on the NIH Study Section (Language and Communication) and the Advisory Council of the National Deafness and Other Communication Disorders, National Institutes of Health. In addition, she was a member of the Committee on Integrating the Science of Early Childhood Development, sponsored by the Board on Children, Youth, and Families of the National Research Council and the Institute of Medicine––the product of this committee was Neurons to Neighborhoods, published by the National Academy of Science. Goldin-Meadow also served as a member of the committee appointed by the Israeli Council for Higher Education to evaluate the field of psychology and behavioral sciences in Israel, and a member of a Blue Ribbon Panel to advise Qatar on developing Behavioral and Social Sciences (Enhancing Qatar's National Research Enterprise: A review of the Qatar National Research Strategy).

== Awards ==
Goldin-Meadow was elected to the National Academy of Sciences and the American Academy of Arts and Sciences and is a fellow of the American Association for the Advancement of Science, the Association for Psychological Science, the American Psychological Association (in Developmental Psychology and Experimental Psychology), the Cognitive Science Society, and the Linguistic Society of America (2010). She received the Ten Outstanding Young Citizens Award for Professional Achievement presented by the Chicago Junior Association of Commerce and Industry, and was awarded a John Simon Guggenheim Fellowship and a James McKeen Cattell Fellowship.

Goldin-Meadow has also received a number of teaching awards, at the undergraduate level (Llewellyn John and Harriet Manchester Quantrell Award for Excellence in Undergraduate Teaching at the University of Chicago) and the graduate level (Burlington Northern Faculty Achievement Award for Graduate Teaching at the University of Chicago), and has also received a Mentor Award from the American Psychological Association (Division 7).

Her book, Hearing Gesture: How Our Hands Help Us Think, received the Cognitive Development Society book award.

Goldin-Meadow presented the Nijmegen Lectures at the Max Planck Institute for Psycholinguistics in the Netherlands, and has served as an APA Distinguished Scientist Lecturer, an APS William James Distinguished Lecturer, and an APA Master Lecturer. She has given a number of named lectures––the Boyd McCandless Lecture, the James and Eleanor Gibson Lecture, the Hersh Leibowitz Lecture, the Spiker Memorial Lecture, and the J. R. Kantor Lecture.

Most recently, Goldin-Meadow was awarded the prestigious 2021 Rumelhart Prize in Cognitive Science. This prize is awarded annually to an individual or collaborative team making a significant contemporary contribution to the theoretical foundations of human cognition.

In 2023, Smith College awarded Goldin-Meadow an honorary degree.

== Research interests ==
Goldin-Meadow's experience at the Piagetian Institute in Geneva piqued her interest in the relation between language and thought. This interest continues to energize her research, which exploits the gestures that we produce with our hands to explore two fundamental questions.

1. Which properties of language are so fundamental to human language that they will appear in a communication system developed by a child who does not have access to linguistic input? Goldin-Meadow studies this question by observing the home-made gestures, called homesigns, that profoundly deaf children create when they are not exposed to sign language. Homesign offers insight into the linguistic properties that are at the core of human language––properties that children are able to invent on their own, and that conventional sign languages are likely to have contained at the earliest stages of their creation.
2. Can the gestures that hearing speakers produce when they talk play a role in learning, in particular, in the transition from an understanding that is grounded in movements in space to an understanding that is abstract and generalizable? The gestures that hearing speakers produce when they talk are robust––they appear in congenitally blind individuals, even when they talk to other blind individuals and even though they have never seen anyone gesture, and in deaf children who use sign language as their primary language. These co-speech gestures reflect a speaker's thoughts, often thoughts that don't appear in the speaker's language (either sign or speech) and that the speaker doesn't even know she has. But gesture can do more than reflect thought––it can play a role in changing thought, as part of the language learning process and, once language has been mastered, as part of the learning process that leads to the acquisition of other skills.
