= Henry Gleitman =

- Born: January 4, 1925; Leipzig, Germany
- Died: September 2, 2015 (aged 90); United States
- Education: City College of New York (B.A.); University of California (M.A., Ph.D.)
- Occupation: professor of psychology
- Known for: Gleitman is best known for his authorship of Psychology, a classic textbook first published in 1981 used in many Introduction to Psychology classes, now in its eighth edition.

Henry Gleitman (January 4, 1925 – September 2, 2015) was a professor of psychology at the University of Pennsylvania.

== Personal life ==
Gleitman obtained both his bachelor's and master's degrees in psychology: the bachelor's degree from the City College of New York, and his master's from the University of California. Henry Gleitman was wed to another psychologist, Lila R. Gleitman. Together, they penned a book together called Phrase and Paraphrase. The book was released in 1970. He fathered two daughters. Their names are Ellen Luchette and Claire Gleitman. Gleitman was born in Leipzig, Germany. He received his PhD in psychology from the University of California, Berkeley. He then taught at Swarthmore College before joining the Penn faculty in 1953.

Gleitman was a cognitive psychologist with interests in language (especially the relationship between semantics and syntax), but he claimed, "I'm probably better identified as a general psychologist whose research interests range over many of the traditional areas of psychological inquiry." Gleitman was willing to work with students in any field of psychology if that student can interest him in his/her proposed field of research.

Gleitman is best known for his authorship of Psychology, a classic textbook first published in 1981 used in many Introduction to Psychology classes, now in its eighth edition.

Gleitman was married to fellow psychologist Lila R. Gleitman, an internationally renowned language acquisition researcher, who was also a professor of psychology and linguistics at the University of Pennsylvania.

== Major accomplishments ==
Gleitman received the Distinguished Teaching in Psychology Award from the American Psychological Foundation in 1982. She also received the Lindback Award in 1977 and the Abrams Award in 1988. She served as president of the American Psychological Association’s Division 1 (General Psychology) and Division 10 (Psychology and the Arts). During more than five decades of teaching, she taught introductory psychology to over 40,000 students.

Gleitman had an array of interest and accomplishments, such as being a known polymath, he was also involved in the arts of theatre in which he both acted and directed while at Berkeley, Philadelphia, and New York City. Besides his interest in psychology, theatrics was a major part of life and he worked with actors of all ages ranging from children all the way up to seasoned professionals. Gleitman would refer to himself as a bigamist because when it came to psychology and theatre, he dichotomized the thought of having to choose, but always found a way to entertain both.

== Quotes ==
"A dream is a kind of nocturnal drama to which the only price of admission is falling asleep." – Psychology

"God must have loved the C student, because he made so many of them." – Henry Gleitman
