= Syntactic bootstrapping =

Theory about language acquisition

Syntactic bootstrapping is a theory in developmental psycholinguistics and language acquisition which proposes that children learn word meanings by recognizing syntactic categories (such as nouns, adjectives, etc.) and the structure of their language. It is proposed that children have innate knowledge of the links between syntactic and semantic categories and can use these observations to make inferences about word meaning. Learning words in one's native language can be challenging because the extralinguistic context of use does not give specific enough information about word meanings. Therefore, in addition to extralinguistic cues, conclusions about syntactic categories are made which then lead to inferences about a word's meaning. This theory aims to explain the acquisition of lexical categories such as verbs, nouns, etc. and functional categories such as case markers, determiners, etc.

== Basis of bootstrapping ==
=== The syntactic-semantic link ===
There are a number of hypotheses that attempt to explain how children acquire various aspects of language, such as syntax and word meanings. Even within the community of those who believe in bootstrapping, there are various hypotheses that attempt to explain how children acquire the same aspect of language. For example, under semantic bootstrapping, learning word meanings to understand the difference between physical objects, agents and actions is used to acquire the syntax of a language. However, prosodic bootstrapping also attempts to explain how children acquire the syntax of their language, but through prosodic cues. Finally, syntactic bootstrapping proposes that word meanings are acquired through knowledge of a language's syntactic structure.

However, regardless of the method of acquisitions, there is a consensus among bootstrappers that bootstrapping theories of lexical acquisition depend on the natural link between semantic meaning and syntactic function. This syntactic-semantic link must be readily available for children to begin learning language and, therefore, must be innate. The link functions to map semantic concepts of objects, actions and attributes to syntactic categories of nouns, verbs and adjectives, respectively.

=== Underlying aspects ===
Diesendruck (2007) characterized these different mapping proposals as being on two dimensions: specificity to word learning and the source of support for word learning. For specificity to word learning, knowledge of lexical constraints is only useful for learning new words whereas attention to novelty is a characteristic of attention that applies beyond the domain of language. The latter dimension involves whether the source of support for word learning is endogenous (within the child) or exogenous (outside the child). For the word-learning task, the child brings their own conceptual understandings about the world, but their input comes from outside them.

As mentioned above, the different theories of lexical acquisition are not mutually exclusive and do overlap each other. P. Bloom (2000) argued that there are three basic capacities that underlie child word learning: understanding mental states, understanding the kinds of things that get labeled, and understanding syntactic cues; these capacities correspond to social-cognitive understandings, cognitive biases and syntax, respectively. These underlying aspects of word learning may also change over time as the child develops. Older children have some syntax and word meanings acquired already so they may be less dependent on their input compared to children just beginning lexical development.

== History ==
One of the earliest demonstrations of the existence of syntactic bootstrapping is an experiment done by Roger Brown at Harvard University in 1957. In his research, Brown demonstrated that preschool-aged children could use their knowledge of different parts of speech to distinguish the meaning of nonsense words in English. The results of Brown's experiment provided the first evidence showing that children could use syntax to infer meaning for newly encountered words and that they acquired grammar and semantics simultaneously. Brown's experiment was the beginning of the framework needed in order for the theory to thrive.

This led developmental psycholinguists like Lila Gleitman, who coined the term syntactic bootstrapping in 1990, to argue that syntax was pivotal for language learning, as it also gives a learner clues about semantics. According to Gleitman's hypothesis, verbs are learned with a delay compared to other parts of speech because the linguistic information that supports their acquisition is not available during the early stages of language acquisition. The acquisition of verb meaning in children is pivotal to their language development. Syntactic bootstrapping seeks to explain how children acquire these words.

== Logic and evidence ==
The syntactic bootstrapping hypothesis is based on the idea that there are universal/innate links between syntactic categories and semantic categories. Learners can therefore use their observations about the syntactic categories of novel words to make inferences about their meanings. This hypothesis is intended to solve the problem that the extralinguistic context is uninformative by itself to make conclusions about a novel word's meaning.

For example, a child hears the sentence, "The cat meeped the bird." If the child is familiar with the way arguments of verbs interact with the verb, he will infer that "the cat" is the agent and that "the bird" is the patient. Then, he can use these syntactic observations to infer that "meep" is a behaviour that the cat is doing to the bird.

Children's ability to identify syntactic categories may be supported by Prosodic bootstrapping. Prosodic bootstrapping is the hypothesis that children use prosodic cues, such as intonation and stress, to identify word boundaries.

=== Sensitivity to syntactic categories ===
Landau and Gleitman (1985) found when studying the acquisition of the verbs look and see by blind children that contextual clues appeared to be insufficient to explain their ability to differentiate these verbs . They considered the possibility that perceptual verbs might be used more by the blind child's mother when talking about nearby objects, since the child had to touch objects to perceive them. An analysis of the mother's utterances however, found this not to be the case.

The solution investigated by Gleitman et al. was that syntactic categories (referred to as 'Sentence Frames' by Gleitman), narrow down the contexts in which verbs are present, allowing children to learn their specific meanings in isolation. This narrowing provided evidence for their original hypothesis. When utterances that selected for perception verbs only were analyzed, the mother's use of the verbs look and see for nearby objects increased significantly. Gleitman concluded that a narrowing of contexts, then contextual support were required for the blind children to learn verbs (in which they had no direct experience).

By proxy, since there are many verbs that sighted children do not have direct experience with, they must use the same mechanism as well. In Gleitman's example, it is shown how direct experience is rarely present, as events are not labelled with their corresponding verb words. When a person returns home they say "Hi! How was your day?" as opposed to "I'm opening the door!"

Gleitman (1990) has this example to provide for the cases of the words /put/ and /look/: /put/ takes three noun entries in the example string "John put the ball on the table" (John, ball, table), as opposed to the two noun entries in "John looked at me." This distinction allows /put/ to be a candidate for a "transfer" type semantic description, as a "transfer" type verb must have a mover, destination, and object partaking in movement (three nouns). Gleitman identifies the matching of these semantic types as the crux of context narrowing, and asserts that many other types exist, such as "perceptual," "mental," "cause," "symmetry," and "cognition."

Additionally, Waxman and Booth (2001) found that children who heard nouns focused on the object categories and children who focused on adjectives focused on an object's properties and categories. This shows that children are sensitive to different syntactic categories and can use their observations of syntax to infer word meaning.

=== Sensitivity to syntactic framing ===
In Roger Brown's 1957 experiment, children between the ages of three and five were shown various pictures depicting nonsense words that represented either singular nouns, mass nouns, count nouns or verbs. When the novel words were positioned in a question format, the children were able to use the placement of the novel word in the sentence to draw conclusions focus on different aspects of the image shown and adjusted their answer. For example, when Brown wanted the child to identify a mass noun, he would ask the children "do you see any sib", and the child would point at the pictured mass noun or noun indicating quantity.

Mass noun environment	Do you see any sib?
Verb environment	What is sibbing?
Singular noun environment	Do you see a sib?

When children made guesses, they were correct more than half of the time. This shows that children are sensitive to the syntactic position of words, and can correctly associate a novel word with its syntactic category.

Harrigan, Hacquard, and Lidz (2016)—Found that children's interpretation of a new attitude verb depended on the syntactic frame in which it was introduced. In the experiment, children who heard the word 'hope' presented in the same syntactic frame as 'want' (i.e. followed by an infinitival verb) connected the new verb 'hope' with a meaning of desire. On the other hand, those that heard 'hope' presented in the same frame as 'think' (i.e. followed by a finite verb) made no such association between desire and the new verb, instead of associating the novel verb with belief. This provides evidence that children use syntax to some extent in learning the meaning behind these sorts of abstract verbs.

Frames of 'Hope' (Harrigan, Hacquard, and Lidz 2016)
Frame	Sentence		Children's Interpretation
'want'	I hope	to be there.	association with desire
'think'	I hope	you will be there.	association with belief

Papafragou, Cassidy, Gleitman (2007)—Participants were asked to identify verbs within the context of a video. Papafragou et al. had children watch 12 videotaped stories. 4 stories about the subject's desires and 8 stories that varied in the subject's beliefs and the framing of a novel verb. At the end of the tape, they would hear a sentence describing the scene but the sentence's verb was replaced with a novel word. Children were asked to respond with what they thought the word meant. Their responses were categorized 4 ways: Action, Belief, Desire, and Other. They found that action words were easily interpreted by children. However, false belief scenes with the complementizer phrase caused for children to respond with belief words more often. Results showed that participants in the experiment identified the verb most accurately when they could use both the video and sentence contexts. When it comes to attitude verbs, children are sensitive to the syntactic framing of the verb in question.

Example Responses from Papafragou et al. (2007)
Categories	Action	Belief	Desire	Other
	Go, Take, Get, Make	Know, Think	Like, Want, Need	Be, Do

Wellwood, Gagliardi, and Lidz (2016)— showed that four-year-olds can understand the difference between a quantitative or qualitative word, based on its syntactic position within a sentence. In "Gleebest of the cows are by the barn," the novel word "gleebest" is in a determiner position, and is inferred to mean "most" or "many." In "the gleebest cows are by the barn," "gleebest" is in an adjective position, and children infer it to mean "spotty" or another quality. These results are significant because they show children using syntax to understand word meanings.

In the Gillette et al. (1999) study—, the researchers tested adults to see what difficulties they would face when asked to identify a word from a muted, videotaped scene. They found that adults had trouble identifying the word, especially verbs, when they could only refer to the scene. Their performance increased once they were given the syntactic context for the mystery word. These results indicate that word learning is aided by the presence of syntactic context.

== Acquiring lexical categories ==
=== Acquiring verbs ===
==== Acquiring novel verbs ====
Gillette et al. (1999) performed experiments which found that participants who were provided both environmental and syntactic contexts were better able to infer what muted word was uttered at a particular point in a video than when only the environmental context was provided. In the experiment, participants were shown muted videos of a mother and infant playing. At a particular point in the video, a beep would sound and participants had to guess what word the beep stood for. It was always a verb or noun. Experimental results showed that participants were correct on identifying nouns more often than verbs. This shows that certain contexts are conducive to learning certain categories of words, like nouns, while the same context is not conducive to learning other categories, like verbs. However, when the scene was paired with a sentence containing all novel words, but the same syntactic structure as the original sentence, adults were better able to guess the verb. This shows that syntactic context is useful in the acquisition of verbs.

An early demonstration by Letitia Naigles (1990) of syntactic bootstrapping involved showing 2-year-olds a video of a duck using its left hand to push a rabbit down into a squatting position while both the animals wave their right arms in circles.

Initial video: Duck uses left hand to push rabbit into squatting position while both animals wave their right arms in circles

During the video, children are presented with one of the following two descriptions:

(6) Utterance A: The duck is kradding the rabbit.
    (describes a situation where the duck does something to the rabbit)
(7) Utterance B: The rabbit and duck are kradding.
    (describes a situation where the duck and the rabbit perform the same action)

Children were then presented two distinct follow-up videos.

Follow-up video 1: the duck pushing the rabbit
Follow-up video 2: the duck and the rabbit are both waving their arms in the air.

When instructed to "find kradding", children looked to the video that illustrated the utterance they heard during the initial video. Children who heard utterance A interpreted kradding to mean the act of the duck pushing on the rabbit, while children who heard utterance B assumed kradding was the action of arm waving. This indicates that children arrive at interpretations of a novel verb based on the utterance context and the syntactic structure in which it was embedded.

In 1990, Lila Gleitman took this idea further by examining the acquisition of verbs in more detail. In her study, she found that children could differentiate between verbs that take one or more arguments and that this knowledge was used to help them narrow down the potential meanings for the verb in question. This discovery explains how children can learn the meaning of verbs that cannot be observed, like 'think'.

In later studies, this was exemplified by Fisher as she proposed that children can use the number of noun phrases in a sentence as evidence about a verb's meaning. She argues that children expect the noun phrases in a sentence to map one-to-one with participant roles in the event described by that sentence. For example, if a toddler hears a sentence that contains two noun phrases, she can infer that that sentence describes an event with two participants. This constrains the meaning that the verb in that sentence can have. Fisher presented 3 and 5-year-old children a video in which one participant caused a second participant to move. Children who heard that scene described by a transitive clause containing a novel verb, associated the subject of the verb with the agent. Children who heard the scene described by an intransitive clause associated the subject with either the agent or the patient. This shows that children make different inferences about meaning depending on the transitivity of the sentence.

==== Acquiring attitude verbs ====
Acquiring the meaning of attitude verbs, which refer to an individual's mental state, provides a challenge for word learners since these verbs do not correlate with any physical aspects of the environment. Words such as 'think' and 'want' do not have physically observable qualities. Thus, there must be something deeper going on that enables children to learn these verbs referring to abstract mental concepts, such as syntactic frames as described in a study above by Harrigan, Hacquard, and Lidz. Because children have no initial idea about the meaning or usage of the words, syntactic bootstrapping aids them in figuring out when verbs refer to mental concepts. If a child hears the statement, "Matt thinks his grandmother is under the covers," three- to four-year-old children will understand that the sentence is about Matt's belief. Children will understand from the syntactic frame in which it was uttered that the verb for mental state, thinks, refers to Matt's beliefs and not to his grandmother's. In addition, Gillette et al. (1999) show that mental state verbs cannot easily be identified when only visual context is available and that these verbs showed the greatest improvement when syntactic context was provided.

=== Acquiring nouns ===
The acquisition of nouns is related to the acquisition of the mass/count contrast. In 1969, Willard Van Orman Quine claimed that children cannot learn new nouns unless they have already acquired this semantic distinction. Otherwise, the word "apples" might refer to the individual objects in a pile or the pile itself, and the child would have no way to know without already understanding the difference between a mass and a count noun. Nancy N. Soja argues that Quine is mistaken, and that children can learn new nouns without fully understanding the mass/count distinction. She found in her study that 2-year-old children were able to learn new nouns (some mass, some count nouns) from inferring meaning from the syntactic structure of the sentence the words were introduced in.

The syntax of an utterance with a noun provides children with cues to whether the noun is a mass noun or count noun. Mass nouns are used for objects whose components are not treated as individuals but as one entity or mass. For example, dirt is a mass noun because it is grammatical in sentences like "There is a pile of dirt," but not "There is a dirt" which is ungrammatical. Count nouns are used for objects viewed as individuals, unlike mass nouns. For example, cat is a count noun because it is grammatical in sentences like "There is a cat," but not "There is a pile of cat" which is ungrammatical. Children can make the distinction between mass and count nouns based on the article that precedes a new word. If a new word immediately follows the article a, then children infer that the noun is a count noun. If a new word immediately follows some, then the new word is inferred as a mass noun.

Mass environment	Count environment
There is a pile of dirt.	There is a cat.
*There is a dirt.	*There is a pile of cat.
I saw some birds.	I saw a bird.
*I saw a birds.	*I saw some bird.

=== Acquiring adjectives ===
In a 2010 study, Syrett and Lidz show that children learn the meaning of novel gradable adjectives on the basis of the adverbs that modify them. Gradable adjectives have a scale associated with them. For example, the adjective "large" places the noun that it modifies on a size scale, while the adjective "expensive" places the noun that is modifiers on a price scale. In addition, gradable adjectives (GA's) subdivide into two classes: relative and maximal GA's.

Relative GA's are words like "big" in (5), and require a reference point: a big mouse is not the same size as a big elephant. As shown in (6) and (7), while relative GAs can be modified by the adverb very they cannot be modified by the adverb completely.

relative gradable adjectives
(5) a.  a big mouse
    b.  a big elephant
(6) a.  a very big mouse
    b.  a very big elephant
(7) a. *a completely big mouse
    b. *a completely big elephant

Maximal GA's are words like, "full" in (8); they operate on a close-ended scale. As shown in (9) and (10), while relative GAs cannot be modified by the adverb very they can be modified by the adverb completely.

maximal gradable adjectives
(8)  a.    a full pool
     b.    a full tank
(9)  a. ?? a very full pool
     b. ?? a very full tank
(10) a.    a completely full pool
     b.    a completely full tank

In the 2010 study, Syrett and Lidz showed children pictures of objects that could be described in terms of both relative and maximal GA's. For example, a picture of a container that could be described as both tall (a relative GA) and clear (a maximal GA).

When showing these objects to the children, the novel adjective used to describe them was prefaced with either adverb very (which usually modifies relative GA's) or the adverb completely (which modifies maximal GA's). As a control, in some contexts, no adverb was present. When the novel adjective was presented with the adverb very, the children assigned a relative GA meaning to it, and when it was presented with adverb completely, a maximal GA. When no adverb was present, the children were unable to assign a meaning to the adjective. This shows that, in order for children to learn the meaning of a new adjective, they depend on grammatical information provide by adverbs about the semantic class of the novel adjective.

An experiment by Wellwood, Gagliardi, and Lidz (2016) showed that four-year-olds associate unknown words with a quality meaning when they are presented with adjective syntax, and with a quantitative meaning when they are presented with determiner syntax. For example, in "Gleebest of the cows are by the barn," "gleebest" would be interpreted as "many" or "four," a quantity. Yet children associate the same unknown word with a quality interpretation when the word is presented in an adjective position. In the sentence "The gleebest cows are by the barn," "gleebest" would be interpreted as "striped" or "purple," a quality. This shows that children use syntax to identify whether a word is an adjective or a determiner, and use that category information to infer aspects of the word's meaning.

== Acquiring functional categories ==
There is a basic contrast between lexical categories (which include open-class items such as verbs, nouns, and adjectives), and functional categories (which include closed-class items such auxiliary verbs, case markers, complementizers, conjunctions and determiners. The acquisition of functional categories has been studied significantly less than the lexical class, so much remains unknown. A 1998 study led by Rushen Shi shows that, at a very young age, Mandarin and Turkish learners use phonological, acoustic and distributional cues to distinguish between words that are lexical categories from words that are functional categories. 11 to 20-month old children were observed speaking with their mothers to evaluate whether speech directed at the children contained clues that they could then use to categorize words as "lexical" or "function". Compared to as lexical category words, functional category words were found to have the following properties:

- simpler syllable structures
- simpler vowels (monophthongs as opposed to diphthongs)
- shorter duration
- lower amplitude
- occur much more frequently in speech

== Challenges to the theory ==
=== Erroneous data at the basis of the syntactic bootstrapping theory ===
As mentioned above, the observation often cited by Gleitman and collaborators as the major empirical basis of the syntactic bootstrapping theory is the seeming insufficiency of contextual cues to explain blind children's ability to learn the perceptual verbs look and see. Gleitman (1990) claimed that if verb acquisition is to be explained by contextual cues, it should be the case that such perceptual verbs are used more by the blind child's mother when talking about nearby objects, since the child had to touch objects to perceive them. According to her analysis this is not the case, unless the relevant input utterance provides the syntactic subcategorization frame of the verbs. Importantly, by her analysis, 'nearbyness' is a much more reliable cue for sentences than for utterances where no syntactic context is given for these verbs. This conclusion yielded the Syntactic Bootstrapping Hypothesis that, for verb learning, full sentences are needed to demonstrate the semantic arguments of verbs. However, reanalysis of Gleitman's crucial data regarding the sentences used by the blind child's mother revealed that this conclusion stems from a misclassification of the maternal sentences as single-word or multiword. The most frequent sentence type for the verb 'look' was Look!, This is NP and for 'see' it is See?, This is NP, for example "Look!, That's a frog!" and "See?, That's a frog!" (Gleitman, 1990, p.26). Gleitman classified these as sentences with syntactic context for the perceptual verbs, which is unfortunately incorrect. Such utterances consist of two sentences, not one, and the verb itself occurs as a single-word utterance, not part of a multiword, syntactically connected sentence. In particular, the additional sentence 'This is NP' does not provide information on the subcategorization frame or on the argument structure of the verbs 'look' or 'see'; it is, simply, an additional and separate sentence. Anat Ninio (2016) pointed out that when this error is corrected, it is found that utterances containing a single-word perception verb are much more likely to have a near and available object than the same verbs in multiword sentence-frames. This raises the possibility that what makes acquisition of the canonical meaning of these verbs possible for young blind children is not the syntactic sentence-frame but, rather, the lack of one. Thus, the conclusions of the paper that children learn these perception verbs (and, by extension, all verbs) only when they can rely on the input from a full sentence's syntactic and semantic information, are unfounded. In two studies examining the production of transitive verbs by young speakers of Hebrew (Ninio, 2015) and English (Ninio, 2016), it was found that children most probably learn their earliest transitive verbs from parental single-word utterances and not from their multiword utterances, although the latter are much more frequent in their speech to young children. Similar results were achieved by Swingley and Humphrey (2018) regarding English-speaking young children's comprehension and production of verbs.

=== Concerning semantic bootstrapping ===
Steven Pinker presents his theory of semantic bootstrapping, which hypothesizes that children use the meaning of words to start to learn the syntax of their language. Gleitman (1990) counters Pinker's ideas by asserting that context is insufficient to supply word meaning, as a single context can allow for multiple interpretations of an uttered sentence. She explains that simply observing objects and events in the world does not provide sufficient information to infer the meanings of words and sentences. Pinker, however, argues that semantic bootstrapping and syntactic bootstrapping aren't conflicting ideas, and that semantic bootstrapping makes no claims about learning word meanings. He argues that since semantic bootstrapping is a hypothesis about how children acquire syntax, while syntactic bootstrapping is a hypothesis about how children acquire word meanings, the opposition between the two theories does not necessarily exist.

Pinker agrees that syntactic categories are in fact used by children to learn semantics and accepts syntactic bootstrapping, but argues that Gleitman applies the hypothesis too broadly, and that is insufficient evidence to account for all of Gleitman's claims. Pinker argues that while children can use syntax to learn certain semantic properties within a single frame, like the number of arguments a verb takes or the types of arguments such as agent and patient, there are serious problems with the argument that children pick up on these semantic properties from the syntax when a verb is found in a wide range of syntactic frames. Pinker uses the verb "sew" as an example:

Frames of "sew" (Pinker 1994)
(You) sew			Activity
(You) sew	the shirt		Activity done to an object.
(You) sew	the shirt	for me	Creating an object for a beneficiary.
(You) sew	the shirt	out of rags	Creating one object out of another.

Pinker argues that the syntax provides information about possible verb frames, but does not help a learner "zoom in" on a verb's meaning after hearing it in multiple frames. According to Pinker, the frames presented above for "sew" can do nothing for learners other than clue them into the fact that "sewing" is some sort of activity. Furthermore, Pinker disagrees with Gleitman's claim that the ambiguities in the situations where a word is used could only be solved by using information about how the word behaves syntactically.

=== Concerning sensitivity to syntactic categories ===
==== Acquisition of subject/object identification according to a statistical model ====
Becker briefly introduces an explanation of subject/object identification that relies on statistics rather than syntactic categories, once the meaning of the verb has been established. In his example, the string "John hit the chair" can have "John" deduced as the subject by a child, as a "chair" is unlikely to "hit" (rare (extraneous) examples include "I was hit by a car"). After several of these strings with the verb "hit," the child observes that inanimate objects, unlikely to possess the ability to "hit," consistently occur in the post-verb position (object). Thus, when approached by the ambiguous case, such as "John hit Bill," where both nouns are fully capable of "hitting," the child asserts that Bill is in the object position, and is the one getting hit.

==== Counterexample to Gleitman's semantic types ====
Wilkins proposes a direct counterexample to Gleitman's example of /put/ and /look/, attested in the Central Australian Aboriginal language of Mparntwe Arrernte. In this case, the verbs /arrerne-/ 'put' and /are-/ 'look, see' share the same case array of {Ergative, Accusative, Dative} arguments (three nouns). Wilkins proposes that this is not a challenge against Gleitman's theory, rather data that may force reconsideration of Gleitman's claim that the theory manifests equally in all languages.

Artwe-le irrtyarte re-nhe arrerne-ke ilthe-ke
man-ERG spear 3SG-ACC put-PST house-DAT
"The man put the spear in the house."

Artwe-le irrtyarte re-nhe are-ke ilthe-ke
man-ERG spear 3SG-ACC look-PST house-DAT
"The man saw the spear in the house." [i.e., describes state of affairs where, from outside the house, the man saw the spear that was located inside the house.]

While /are-/ 'look, see' shares the same three noun structure, it serves as an equal candidate for Gleitman's "transfer" type, losing the important context narrowing. Losing this early distinction should lead the child astray, yet they develop the language just the same, therefore a more subtle difference than the argument frame must exist.

== Applications cross-linguistically ==
With all of the studies above supporting or challenging syntactic bootstrapping, how does the theory hold up cross-linguistically?

=== Applications to French and German ===
Two studies focusing on French and German were determining the use of syntactic contexts to classify novel words as nouns or verbs. The German study found that children between 14 and 16 months could use determiners to classify a novel word as a noun. However, they could not show the same ability mapping pronoun environments to verbs. Overall, this exemplifies their ability to determine the categories of function words and shows a sensitivity to syntactic framing. Following this conclusion, Christophe et al. found that children can use this ability along with prosodic bootstrapping to infer the syntactic category of the neighboring content words, as at 23 months they can classify novel nouns as well as verbs based on their surrounding syntactic environment. These studies follow the Syntactic Bootstrapping model of language acquisition. However, the determiner/noun and pronoun/verb environments are also found in English. So, how well does this theory apply to a language structurally different from English?

=== Applications to Mandarin ===
In Lee and Naigles' 2005 experiment, they are the very first to demonstrate that Mandarin, a language with pervasive NP ellipsis, has the necessary syntactic information for children learning Mandarin.

In the experiment they found a potential challenge to the use of syntactic bootstrapping, which is the fact that transitive and intransitive verbs exist in practically the same syntactic frame:

背 到 婆婆 那
Bei dao {po po} na
Carry arrive grandma there
Carry (it to) grandma (who is over there)

走 去 婆婆 那
Zou qu {po po} na
Walk go grandma there
Walk (over to) grandma there

Lee and Naigles looked into how Mandarin children use the transitive versus intransitive environments to infer meaning in a language that allows the noun phrase (subject or object) argument to go unpronounced. They focused on the naturalistic adult input provided to children under 2 years of age. Following Fisher's studies where children use the number of NP's to make conclusions about the causation in the sentence, 1 NP is an intransitive sentence and involves only the agent while 2 NP's is a transitive environment and involves an action being taken upon something or someone.

	Intransitive environment		Transitive environment		
Role	Agent	Non-causative verb	Agent	Causative verb	Theme
Example	The dog	comes	The dog	brings	the lion

Other verb tokens were categorized into each frame as follows:

Reduplicated verb: the target verb was immediately followed by a second identical verb, as the example in (3)

你 快 给 爸爸 看 看
ni kuai gei baba kan kan
you quickly give daddy look look
you (let) daddy (take a quick) look

Compounding verb: the target verb was immediately followed by a second, nonidentical verb, as the example in (4)

你 这 就 吃 完 饭
ni zhe jiu chi wan fan
you this then eat finish rice
you already finished eating your rice

The environment above was presented in the study and then altered to test the change of interpretation the Mandarin children might have. Due to the pervasive ellipsis in Mandarin, the number of NP's in a phrase is a weaker clue in mapping causation or non-causation of a verb. Presented with an elided transitive environment The dog brings, the children determined the sentence to be intransitive, meaning they changed their interpretation of the verb based on the number of noun phrases presented. This was shown as the children used toys to act out the scenario they heard; if their interpretation were to be independent of the number of NP's they would have shown the dog bringing the lion. However, they showed the dog going on its own, showing their interpretation of the verb to be non-causative. This follows the syntactic bootstrapping theory as their mapping of verb meaning relied on the syntactic frame and content in the sentence. However, it poses another question about how Mandarin children can go on to map transitive or intransitive environments properly during their development.

=== Language-specific word order ===
A few studies have begun to look at how children learning languages with different word orders represent syntactic structures which are required for children to map word meanings or categories using syntactic bootstrapping. For example, the research on the acquisition of verbs presents English children as using information about the subject and objects to determine if the verb is causative or non-causative. However, will this ability change in a language which has the object occurring before the verb? One could assume this to be a difficult task if both an English child and child leaning an SOV language have the same mental representation of syntactic structure. To address this, a Gervain, et al., looked at an infant's mental representation of Japanese, which is a complement – head language with an object-verb (OV) word order, and Italian, which like English, is head-complement and therefore has a verb-object (VO) word order. They found that 8-month-olds have a general knowledge of word order specific to their language preceding their acquisition of lexical items or syntactic categories. Their attuning of structural relations of syntactic categories (verbs, nouns, etc.) within their language allows them to then apply this knowledge later in their development, possibly allowing for language-specific syntactic bootstrapping.

== The effects of bilingualism ==
Cleave, Kay-Raining Bird have conducted a group study of bilingualism in children with DS. This study involved both monolingual and bilingual children with DS (DS-M, DS-B) and monolingual and bilingual typically developing children (TD-M, TD-B). Children's age of these four groups were matched on developmental level. The monolingual children are native English speakers. The bilingual children were English-dominant or balanced bilinguals, most of them have French as their second language. In the experiment, participants' English proficiency was compared and contrasted. No significant differences were observed on standardized tests or language sample measures between the monolingual and bilingual DS groups. This suggests that, at least in the dominant language, bilingualism did not have a harmful effect on syntactic bootstrapping and language development.

In Cleave, Kay-Raining Bird, Trudeau and Sutton's 2014 experiment, researchers included four groups of children: i) bilingual children and youth with DS (DS-B), ii) monolingual children and youth with DS (DS-M), iii) bilingual typically developing children (TD-B) and iv) monolingual typically developing children (TD-M). These four groups were compared on a receptive syntactic bootstrapping task (fast mapping task). The task materials included the presentation of familiar and novel actors and actions in a computer-generated task. The root form of all novel words had a CVC syllabic structure and followed the phonotactic constraints of English (e.g., moit, zug). A total of 14 trials including 2 test trials were shown to the participants. Each trial included a familiar and a novel actor. The 14 familiar actions were represented by common intransitive verbs. (e.g. flying or running) The unfamiliar actions consisted of verb does not exist. (e.g. doing face-up push-ups). The trial message are shown below:

Noun trails message	Verb trails message
Look, a X. I see a X. A X.	Look, Xing. I see Xing. Xing.

Thus, in trials with novel words, it was only the linguistic cue of "a" or "ing" which indicated whether the novel word referred to the creature or the unfamiliar action. Researchers recorded message "point to X" to test if the child comprehended the stimulus word. It requires the participant to attend to language form and meaning simultaneously.

The proportion correct on syntactic bootstrapping task by group is shown below:

PROPORTION CORRECT
DS-M	DS-B	TD-M	TD-B
0.25	0.275	0.4	0.33

The current study included both nouns and verbs and found correlational results similar to those of previous studies involving nouns only. Previous fast mapping studies with bilingual children have involved novel objects but not actions. The results showed a higher matching rate of unfamiliar nouns among all the four groups. This is in accordance with previous studies involving only monolingual children that have reported better performance on nouns than verbs However, in a similar research conducted in 1990 which incorporated both nouns and verbs have found similar performance for the both word types. Factors such as different attentional demands, stability of the referen and imageability have been proposed to explain the noun advantage seen in young children's vocabularies.

Researchers examined the impact of bilingualism on task performance by comparing the two TD groups and the two DS groups. As the rate of their successful syntactic bootstrapping did not differ on the fast mapping task, no evidence of an impact was obtained from the group analyses nor were there any advantages. This finding is consistent with the previous work that found comparable language skills in monolingual and bilingual children and youth with DS using product measures and extends such findings to a dynamic syntactic bootstrapping task.

=== Children with Down Syndrome ===
Children with Down Syndrome display a broad range of deficits including both cognitive and language impairments. In Cleave et al.'s 2014 experiment mentioned above, it is claimed that TD-M performed significantly better than DS-M, TD-B performed better than DS-B, however, no significant difference was reached. The major finding of this study was that there was no evidence that bilingualism negatively affects syntactic bootstrapping skills in children with DS.

==== Monolingual children with DS ====
Studies in oral language development of monolingual children with DS show that they have a relative strength in receptive language skills. In particular, an advantage at vocabulary skills which are often equivalent to non-verbal cognitive development with individual variability have been found. Meanwhile, their expressive language skills were proven to be lagged behind receptive skills and they display a particular deficit in expressive morphosyntactic skills. This is seen in both a smaller mean length of utterance (MLU) in comparison to mental age matches and poorer grammatical morpheme use compared to typically developing children matched for MLU

==== Bilingual children with DS ====
Research on syntactic bootstrapping performance of bilingual children with DS is very limited. In a 2011 experiment, researchers explored the effects of second language exposure on a number of specific cognitive tasks. Monolingual children with DS who have been exposed only to English were compared to Bilingual children with DS who had exposure to a second language. The age, IQ, gender and socio-economic status of participants were matched. No significant differences of language acquisition abilities were found on any of the measures administered.

== See also ==
- Bootstrapping (linguistics)
- Semantic bootstrapping
- Prosodic bootstrapping
