= Malinda Carpenter =

Fellow of the Royal Society of Edinburgh

Malinda Carpenter FRSE
- Occupation: Professor of Developmental Psychology
- Employer: University of St. Andrews
- Organization: Max Planck Society
- Known for: research into infant and child communications and learning; prosocial behaviour; ape and human social cognition and Human–robot interaction communication futures

Malinda Carpenter, Ph.D, FRSE is a professor of developmental psychology at the University of St Andrews, an international researcher specialising in infant and child communications, prosocial behaviour and group reactions, in how people learn to understand others, and building self esteem; her work includes research between ape and human social cognition, and more recently in considering human-robotic communication futures.

== Education and career ==
Carpenter graduated in French and Psychology, from the University of Florida, Gainesville in 1990, and took her masters in 1993 and doctorate in 1995, at Emory University, USA on Social-cognitive abilities of 9- to 15-month-old infants: Development and interrelationships. She spend two years post-doc research at the National Institute of Mental Health Postdoctoral Training Program in Developmental Psychology (focussing on autism) at the University of Denver, Denver, Colorado, USA and then a further two years as a post-doc Fellow at the University of Liverpool, England. She collaborated with Virginia Slaughter, of the University of Queensland, Australia in 2008-09. Since 2013, she has worked in the University of St. Andrews, Scotland and continued her relationship with the Max Planck Institute for Evolutionary Anthropology in Leipzig, Germany, since 1999, when she was senior scientist on Social Origins of Cultural Cognition in Infancy and (from 2008- 2013) when she was awarded funding to head the Minerva Foundation Research Group in the Max Planck Institute. She joined academia.net in 2010 and speaks English, French, German, Spanish.

Carpenter has been an invited or a keynote speaker at international conferences and key summer schools over her career, for example:

- Cultural Learning, Imitation and Articraft Understanding: A Comparative Perspective at summer school, Central European University, 2005
- 'What makes humans human?' at AX Foundation seminar 2011
- Human Robot Interaction at Bielefeld University 2014
- From Human-Human Joint Action to Human-Robot Joint Action, and vice versa!, at Toulouse, 2016: The jointness in infants' and young children's joint action and joint attention
- Guest speaker at cross-discipline summer workshop for early career researchers, Brace yourself! at St. Andrews, 2018.

For an up to date list of her academic related activities, see the activities page on the staff profile at the University of St. Andrews.

== Recognition ==
In 2012, Carpenter was selected as a Fellow of the Association of Psychological Science. In 2018, one of her supervised students, Amrisha Vaish won their early career award.

She was associate editor of the academic journal Cognition (2013–14) and on the editorial board of Child Development Perspectives since 2013.

At the opening of the Leipzig Center for Early Child Development, in 2016, marking the 50th anniversary of conferences of the German Society for Psychology, Carpenter was asked to be one of the keynote speakers, talking upon Affiliation, alignment and belonging in infancy and early childhood.

In 2021, Carpenter was elected as a Fellow of the Royal Society of Edinburgh.

She has joined the Templeton World Charity Foundation funded Diverse Intelligences Summer Institute: 'A new community exploring intelligence, mind, and cognition in all its forms'.

== Research experiments and publications ==
Carpenter's research has involved practical as well as theoretical studies and in outreach to share her findings with the public. Her studies have formed part of international research bases, cited for psychology and developmental behavioural themes, such as

- Imitation
- Intention
- Joint attention
- Nonverbal communication
- Bootstrapping (linguistics)

Her earlier experiments were described in detail so they could be replicated. Her collaborative research on chimpanzees was published in a book. As well as collaborations listed, her work was also with Michael Tomasello and jointly published their 2005 research, and earlier George Butterworth. Her international interests in 2017 extended to bilingualism in young children, and she was nominated by the students union in St. Andrew's for a 2019 Teaching Awards and shortlisted as a finalist for her academic mentorship.

Later she engaged in more public communications on the research and its impact for child development practices and parenting skills. Carpenter supported a local community science outreach (March 2018: becoming one of us), and a public radio debate on 'crowd science', as reported in Church Times. She was interviewed in the Greater Good podcast, from Berkeley on how her experiment on using familiar objects and dolls positioning, to see if they influenced children's behaviour towards acting helpfully to adults. The St. Andrew's Baby and Child (ABC) Lab. was another such project, which had been enrolling mother and child pairs, and individual children to observe and assist the research. The project drew the attention of Netflix for a follow up to its TV series on Babies? The series 2 episode 4 Relationships was described as 'A coy smile, a puppet show and a pointed finger lead to discoveries in how babies get along with others using humor, morality and shared experiences', and featured Carpenter's team's studies.

== External resources ==
- Netflix trailer for Babies? season 2
- Research publications (University of St. Andrew's listing)
- Research works (Orcid Listing)
- Research works (LOOP Listing)
