= Lila R. Gleitman =

American psycholinguist (1929–2021)

Lila Gleitman
- Born: December 10, 1929; New York City, US
- Died: August 8, 2021 (aged 91)
- Education: Antioch College (B.A.); University of Pennsylvania (M.A., Ph.D.)
- Occupations: Linguist; professor
- Known for: Cognitive science research
- Spouse: Henry Gleitman

External videos
- “2013 APS Mentor Award Lila R. Gleitman”, 2017
- “Inside the Psychologist’s Studio with Lila Gleitman”, 2017
- “Lila R. Gleitman, University of Pennsylvania: Rome Wasn't Built in a Day But Maybe Latin Was", May 2017

Lila Ruth Gleitman (December 10, 1929 – August 8, 2021) was an American professor of psychology and linguistics at the University of Pennsylvania. She was an internationally renowned expert on language acquisition and developmental psycholinguistics, focusing on children's learning of their first language.

== Personal life ==
Lila Ruth Lichtenberg was born in Sheepshead Bay, Brooklyn in 1929. She graduated from James Madison High School.

Her first marriage to Eugene Galanter ended in divorce. She was married to fellow psychologist Henry Gleitman until his death on September 2, 2015. He also was a professor of psychology at the University of Pennsylvania. The Gleitmans had two daughters. Lila Ruth Gleitman died on August 8, 2021, at the age of 91.

== Professional career ==
Gleitman was awarded a B.A. in literature from Antioch College in 1952, an M.A. in linguistics from the University of Pennsylvania in 1962, and a Ph.D. in linguistics from the University of Pennsylvania in 1967. She studied under Zellig Harris.

She was employed as an assistant professor at Swarthmore College before accepting a position as the William T. Carter Professor of Education at the University of Pennsylvania from 1972 to 1973. Subsequently, she served as a professor of linguistics and as the Steven and Marcia Roth Professor of Psychology at the University of Pennsylvania from 1973 until her retirement.

Gleitman is recognized as a pioneer of cognitive science. Her research led to the development of her renowned theory of syntactic bootstrapping. The theory led Gleitman and Barbara Landau to pursue new explanations of how blind children can effortlessly acquire spoken language related to vision (e.g., the words "look", "see", and words about colors). Gleitman's research interests included language acquisition, morphology and syntactic structure, psycholinguistics, syntax, and construction of the lexicon. Notable former students include Elissa Newport, Barbara Landau, and Susan Goldin-Meadow.

The influence of Gleitman's research in language acquisition has been recognized by numerous organizations. She was elected as a fellow in the American Psychological Association, the Association for Psychological Science, the Society of Experimental Psychologists, the American Association for the Advancement of Science, the American Academy of Arts & Sciences, the Linguistic Society of America and the National Academy of Sciences. She won the David Rumelhart Prize in 2017. She served as president of the Linguistic Society of America in 1993.

=== Lila R. Gleitman Prize for Early-Career Contributions to Cognitive Science ===
In 2023, the Cognitive Science Society and the Society for Language Development established the Lila R. Gleitman Prize for Early-Career Contributions to Cognitive Science. The annual award recognizes an early-career woman researcher in cognitive science whose work reflects the intellectual depth and significance of Gleitman’s research.

==== Recipients ====
The prize is awarded annually at the Cognitive Science Society's Annual Meeting.

Year	Recipient	Institution	Research / Contributions
2023	Talia Konkle	Harvard University	Visual and cognitive neuroscience of the object world.
2024	Isabelle Dautriche	Aix-Marseille University / CNRS	Language acquisition, communication, and early cognitive foundations.
2025	Moira Dillon	New York University	Cognitive development, geometric reasoning, and spatial navigation.
2026	Judith Fan	Stanford University	Cognitive tools, visual communication, and mental representations of thought.

Gleitman described her linguistic interests on the member page for the National Academy of Sciences:

One of my main interests concerns the architecture and semantic content of the mental lexicon, i.e., the psychological representation of the forms and meanings of words. My second major interest is in how children acquire both the lexicon and the syntactic structure of the native tongue.

The New York Times noted that Gleitman built on work by linguist Noam Chomsky and "designed elegant experiments to show that syntax is hard-wired into the human brain".

== Major publications ==
See for a full list of publications.

- Shipley, E., Smith, C., & Gleitman, L. (1969). A study in the acquisition of language: Free responses to commands. Language, 45(2), 322–342.
- Gleitman, L., & Gleitman H. (1970). Phrase and paraphrase. NY: Norton.
- Newport, E., Gleitman, H., & Gleitman, L. (1977). Mother, I'd rather do it myself: Some effects and non-effects of maternal speech style. In C. Snow & C. Ferguson (Eds.), Talking to children: Language input and acquisition. NY: Cambridge University Press.
- Landau, B., & Gleitman, L. (1985). Language and experience: Evidence from the blind child. Cambridge: Harvard University Press. (Paperback published 1987)
- Fowler, A., Gelman, R., & Gleitman, L. (1994)"The Course of Language Learning in Children with Down Syndrome". In H. Flager-Flusberg (ed), Constraints on language acquisition: Studies of atypical children. Hillsdale, NJ: Erlbaum.
- Gleitman, L.R., & Reisberg, D. (2011). Language. Revised In H. Gleitman, D. Reisberg & M. Gross (Eds.), Psychology (8th ed.)
- Gleitman, L.R., Liberman, M.Y., McLemore, C. Partee, B.H. (January 2019). The Impossibility of Language Acquisition (and How They Do It). Annual Review of Linguistics.
