= Salvatore Valitutti =

Italian educator and politician (1907–1992)

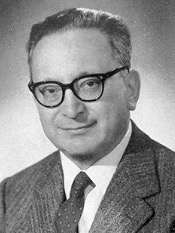

Minister of Public Education
- In office 5 August 1979 – 4 April 1980
- Prime Minister: Francesco Cossiga
- Preceded by: Giovanni Spadolini
- Succeeded by: Adolfo Sarti

Personal details
- Born: 30 September 1907 Bellosguardo
- Died: 1 October 1992 (aged 85) Rome
- Resting place: Bellosguardo cemetery
- Party: Italian Liberal Party

Salvatore Valitutti (1907–1992) was an educator and liberal politician who served as the minister of public education in the cabinet led by Prime Minister Francesco Cossiga in the period 1979–1980. He was one of the proponents of the Montessori education movement.

== Early life and education ==
Valitutti was born in Bellosguardo, near Salerno, on 30 September 1907. His parents were Giuseppe and Amalia Macchiaroli, and he was the fifth of twelve siblings.

After completing his secondary education in Salerno, Valitutti attended the University of Political Sciences in Rome, graduating with a degree in political science in 1930.

== Career ==
Valitutti was an academic by profession and was the president of the University for Foreigners in Perugia. He was one of the supporters of the Montessori education movement and served as the vice president of the Opera Nazionale Montessori which was established by Maria Montessori to make her method of education widespread in Italy.

In 1963 Valitutti was elected as a deputy and began to serve at the Italian Parliament. He also served at the Italian Senate for the Italian Liberal Party for two terms: from Campania in 1972 and from Lazio in 1983. In 1972 he was appointed undersecretary of the Ministry of Education.

He was the vice president of the Liberal Party from 19 February to 4 July 1976. In 1971 Valitutti launched a magazine entitled Nuovi Studi Politici and published several articles in the magazine. He was named as the minister of public education in the cabinet of Francesco Cossiga and was in office between 5 August 1979 and 4 April 1980.

=== Death and legacy ===
Valitutti died in Rome on 1 October 1992. He was buried in the Bellosguardo cemetery next to his wife.

In memory of him a prize was established, Salvatore Valitutti International Prize.
