= 1970 National Society of Film Critics Awards =

Annual US film award ceremony

5th NSFC Awards

January 10, 1971

Best Film:
M*A*S*H

The 5th National Society of Film Critics Awards, given on 10 January 1971, honored the best filmmaking of 1970.

The member critics voting for the awards were Hollis Alpert of the Saturday Review, Gary Arnold of The Washington Post, Harold Clurman of The Nation, Jay Cocks of Time, David Denby of The Atlantic, Penelope Gilliatt of The New Yorker, Philip T. Hartung of Commonweal, Pauline Kael of The New Yorker, Stefan Kanfer of Time, Stanley Kauffmann of The New Republic, Arthur Knight of Saturday Review, Robert Kotlowitz of Harper's Magazine, Joseph Morgenstern of Newsweek, Andrew Sarris of The Village Voice, Richard Schickel of Life, Arthur M. Schlesinger, Jr. of Vogue, John Simon of The New Leader, Bruce Williamson of Playboy, and Paul D. Zimmerman of Newsweek.

== Winners ==
=== Best Picture ===
M*A*S*H (27 points)

2. The Passion of Anna (25 points)
3. The Wild Child (18 points)
4. My Night at Maud's (16 points)
5. Five Easy Pieces (10 points)

=== Best Director ===
Ingmar Bergman – The Passion of Anna (24 points)

2. François Truffaut – The Wild Child (20 points)
3. Robert Altman – M*A*S*H (19 points)
4. Luis Buñuel – Tristana (10 points)
5. Bob Rafelson – Five Easy Pieces (9 points)

=== Best Actor ===
George C. Scott – Patton (18 points)

2. George Segal – Loving, The Owl and the Pussycat, and Where's Poppa? (14 points)
3. Jean-Louis Trintignant – My Night at Maud's (12 points)
4. Jack Nicholson – Five Easy Pieces (11 points)
5. Alan Arkin – Catch-22 (9 points)

=== Best Actress ===
Glenda Jackson – Women in Love (27 points)

2. Françoise Fabian – My Night at Maud's (20 points)
3. Liv Ullmann – The Passion of Anna (15 points)
4. Barbra Streisand – The Owl and the Pussycat (9 points)
5. Carrie Snodgress – Diary of a Mad Housewife (8 points)

=== Best Supporting Actor ===
Chief Dan George – Little Big Man (21 points)

2. Anthony Perkins – Catch-22 and WUSA (16 points)
3. Richard Castellano – Lovers and Other Strangers (11 points)
4. Peter Boyle – Joe (8 points)
4. Paul Mazursky – Alex in Wonderland (8 points)

=== Best Supporting Actress ===
Lois Smith – Five Easy Pieces (29 points)

2. Sally Kellerman – M*A*S*H (12 points)
3. Eva Marie Saint – Loving (10 points)
4. Karen Black – Five Easy Pieces (9 points)
4. Trish Van Devere – Where's Poppa? (9 points)

=== Best Screenplay ===
Éric Rohmer – My Night at Maud's (23 points)

2. Ingmar Bergman – The Passion of Anna (17 points)
3. Adrien Joyce [Carole Eastman] – Five Easy Pieces (15 points)
4. François Truffaut and Jean Gruault – The Wild Child (13 points)
5. Jorge Semprún – The Confession (10 points)

=== Best Cinematography ===
Néstor Almendros – The Wild Child and My Night at Maud's (24 points)

2. Sven Nykvist – The Passion of Anna and First Love (18 points)
3. Billy Williams – Women in Love (16 points)
4. Giuseppe Rotunno – Fellini Satyricon (7 points)

=== Special awards ===
- Donald Richie and the Film Department of the Museum of Modern Art for the three-month Retrospective of Japanese Films which they held in 1970
- Daniel Talbot of the New Yorker theater for the contribution he has made to the cinema by showing films that might not otherwise have been available to the public
