= National Board of Review Awards 1970 =

Annual film awards

42nd National Board of Review Awards
January 3, 1971
Best Film: Patton

The 42nd National Board of Review Awards were announced on January 3, 1971.

== Top Ten Films ==
1. Patton
2. Kes
3. Women in Love
4. Five Easy Pieces
5. Ryan's Daughter
6. I Never Sang for My Father
7. Diary of a Mad Housewife
8. Love Story
9. The Virgin and the Gypsy
10. Tora! Tora! Tora!

== Top Foreign Films ==
1. The Wild Child
2. My Night at Maud's
3. The Passion of Anna
4. The Confession
5. This Man Must Die

== Winners ==
- Best Film:
  - Patton
- Best Foreign Film:
  - The Wild Child
- Best Actor:
  - George C. Scott - Patton
- Best Actress:
  - Glenda Jackson - Women in Love
- Best Supporting Actor:
  - Frank Langella - Diary of a Mad Housewife, The Twelve Chairs
- Best Supporting Actress:
  - Karen Black - Five Easy Pieces
- Best Director:
  - François Truffaut - The Wild Child
