= Édouard Séguin =

French physician and educationist (1812–1880)

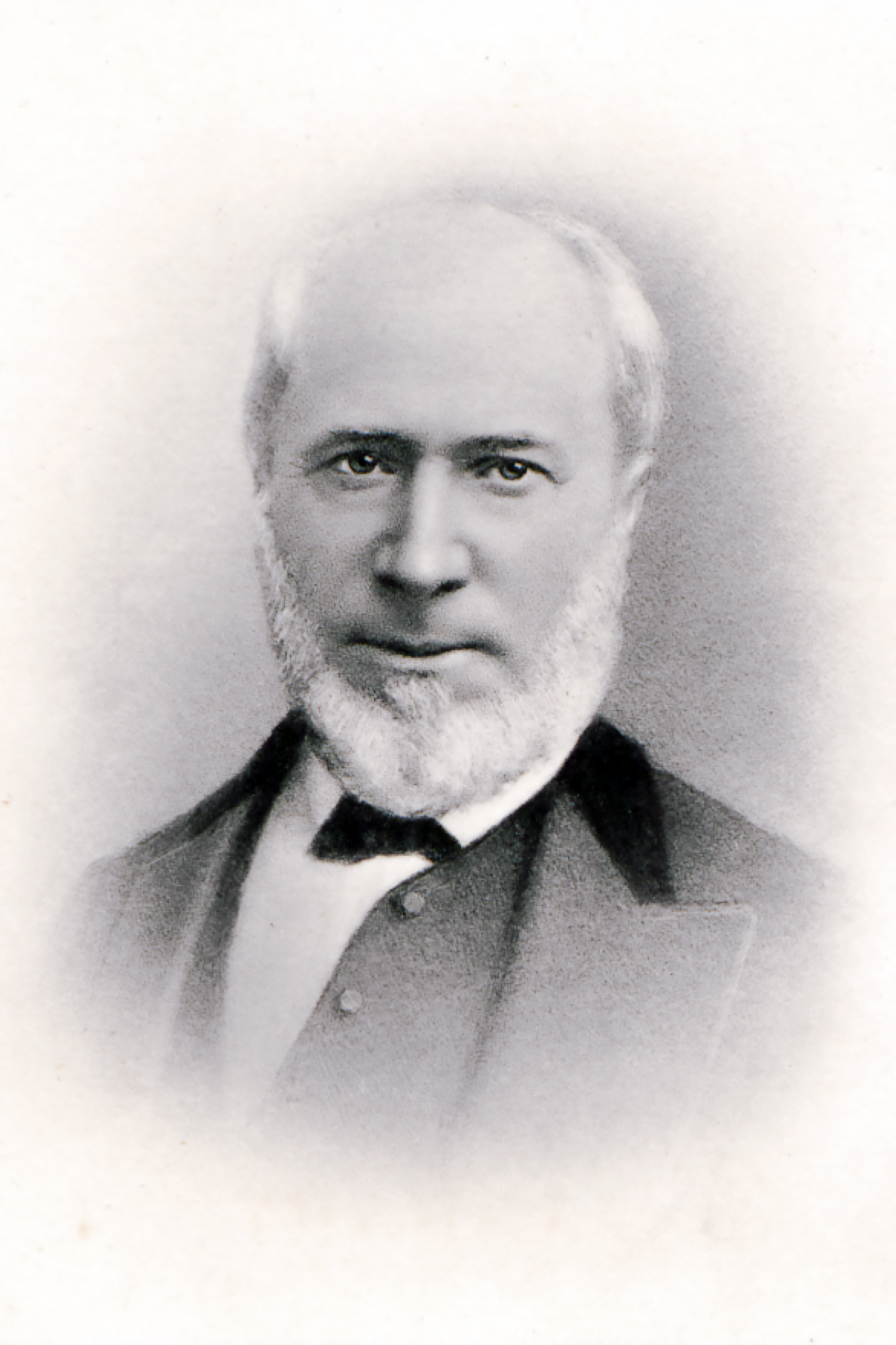
- Born: January 20, 1812; Clamecy, Nièvre, France
- Died: October 28, 1880 (aged 68)
- Education: Collège d’Auxerre, Lycée Saint-Louis
- Known for: Work with children with cognitive impairments
- Scientific career
- Fields: Physician

Édouard Séguin (January 20, 1812 – October 28, 1880) was a French medical doctor and educator born in Clamecy, Nièvre. He is remembered for his work with children having cognitive impairments in France and the United States.

== Background and career in France ==
He studied at the Collège d’Auxerre and the Lycée Saint-Louis in Paris, and from 1837 studied and worked under Jean Marc Gaspard Itard, who was an educator of deaf-mute individuals, including the celebrated case of Victor of Aveyron, also known as "The Wild Child". Itard persuaded Séguin to dedicate himself to studying the causes and training of individuals with intellectual disabilities. As a young man, Séguin was also influenced by the ideas of utopian socialist Henri de Saint-Simon.

Around 1840, he established the first private school in Paris dedicated to educating individuals with intellectual disabilities. In 1846, he published Traitement Moral, Hygiène, et Education des Idiots (The Moral Treatment, Hygiene, and Education of Idiots and Other Backward Children). This work is considered the earliest systematic textbook on the special needs of children with intellectual disabilities.

== Achievements in the United States ==
Following the European revolutions of 1848, Séguin emigrated to the United States. After visiting various schools modelled on his own that had been established in the United States and assisting in their organisation, he settled in Cleveland, and later in Portsmouth, Ohio. Later he relocated to New York State and set up a medical practice in Mount Vernon (1860). In 1861, he received an M.D. from the University of the City of New York. In 1863, he moved to New York City, where he worked to improve conditions for children with disabilities at Randall's Island asylum.

In the United States, he established several schools in various cities to treat the mentally disabled. In 1866, he published "Idiocy: and its Treatment by the Physiological Method"; a book in which he described the methods used at the "Séguin Physiological School" in New York City. Programs used in Séguin's schools stressed the importance of developing self-reliance and independence in the intellectually disabled by giving them a combination of physical and intellectual tasks.

Édouard Séguin became the first president of the "Association of Medical Officers of American Institutions for Idiotic and Feebleminded Persons", an organisation that is now known as the American Association on Intellectual and Developmental Disabilities. Séguin's work influenced the Italian physician and educator Maria Montessori. Starting in 1897, she read his books along with Itard's and later produced handwritten Italian translations of both authors' works. While working at the Orthophrenic School in Rome from 1900 to 1901, Montessori first used Itard's and Séguin's methods with children who had learning difficulties. She focused on physical activities like walking and using a spoon, sense training with sights, smells, and touch, and introducing letters in a form children could feel. She later adapted these activities for mainstream children, and they became the Montessori sensorial materials.

In the 1870s, Séguin published three works in the field of thermometry, a field he had been devoting himself to since 1866: Thermomètres physiologiques (Paris, 1873); Tableaux de thermométrie mathématique (1873); and "Medical Thermometry and Human Temperature" (New York, 1876). He also devised a special "physiological thermometer" in which zero was the standard temperature of health. In addition, a medical symptom known as "Séguin's signal" is named after him, being described as an involuntary muscle contraction prior to an epileptic attack.

== Works ==
- Traitement Moral, Hygiène et éducation des idiots et des autres enfants arriérés ... Paris: Baillière. 1846.
- Idiocy: and its Treatment by the Physiological Method. New York: W. Wood & Co. 1866.
- New Facts and Remarks Concerning Idiocy: Being a Lecture Delivered before the New York Medical Journal Association, October 15, 1869. New York: Wood. 1870.
- Medical Thermometry, and Human Temperature. New York. 1871.
- Report on Education. Washington: Government Printing Office. 1875.
- Psycho-physiological Training of the Idiotic Hand. New York: G.P. Putnam's Sons. 1879.
