= Women in Love (film) =

1969 British film directed by Ken Russell

- Theatrical release poster
- Directed by: Ken Russell
- Screenplay by: Larry Kramer
- Based on: Women in Love; 1920 novel by D. H. Lawrence
- Produced by: Larry Kramer
- Starring: Alan Bates; Oliver Reed; Glenda Jackson; Jennie Linden; Eleanor Bron
- Cinematography: Billy Williams
- Edited by: Michael Bradsell
- Music by: Georges Delerue; Michael Garrett
- Production company: Brandywine Productions
- Distributed by: United Artists
- Release dates: 13 November 1969 (UK); 25 March 1970 (USA)
- Running time: 131 minutes
- Country: United Kingdom
- Language: English
- Budget: $1.6 million
- Box office: $4.5 million (Worldwide)

Women in Love is a 1969 British romantic drama film directed by Ken Russell and starring Alan Bates, Oliver Reed, Glenda Jackson, and Jennie Linden. The film was adapted by Larry Kramer from D. H. Lawrence's 1920 novel Women in Love. It was the first film to be released by Brandywine Productions.

The plot follows the relationships between two sisters and two men in a mining town in post-World War I England. The two couples take markedly different directions. The film explores the nature of commitment and love.

The film was nominated for four Academy Awards, with Jackson winning the Academy Award for Best Actress for her role, and the film receiving other honours.

== Plot ==
The film is set in the Midlands mining town of Beldover in 1920. Two sisters, Ursula and Gudrun Brangwen, discuss marriage on their way to the wedding of Laura Crich, daughter of the town's wealthy mine owner, Thomas Crich, to Tibby Lupton, a naval officer. At the village's church, each sister is fascinated by a particular member of the wedding party – Gudrun by Laura's brother, Gerald, and Ursula by Gerald's best friend, Rupert Birkin. Ursula is a school teacher and Rupert is a school inspector; she remembers his visit to her classroom, interrupting her botany lesson to discourse on the sexual nature of the catkin.

The four are later brought together at a house party at the estate of Hermione Roddice, a rich woman whose relationship with Rupert is falling apart. When Hermione devises, as entertainment for her guests, a dance in the "style of the Russian ballet", Rupert becomes impatient with her pretensions and tells the pianist to play some ragtime. This sets off spontaneous dancing among the whole group which angers Hermione and makes her leave. When Rupert follows her into the next room, she smashes a glass paperweight against his head, and he staggers outside. He discards his clothes and wanders through the woods. Later, at the Criches' annual picnic, to which most of the town is invited, Ursula and Gudrun find a secluded spot, and Gudrun dances before some Highland cattle while Ursula sings "I'm Forever Blowing Bubbles". When Gerald and Rupert appear, Gerald calls Gudrun's behaviour "impossible and ridiculous", and then says he loves her. "That's one way of putting it", she replies. Ursula and Rupert wander away discussing death and love. They make love in the woods. The day ends in tragedy when Laura and Tibby drown while swimming in the lake.

During one of Gerald and Rupert's discussions, Rupert suggests Japanese-style wrestling. They strip and wrestle in the firelight. Rupert enjoys their closeness and says they should swear to love each other, but Gerald cannot understand Rupert's idea of wanting to have an emotional union with a man as well as an emotional and physical union with a woman. Ursula and Rupert decide to marry while Gudrun and Gerald continue to see each other. One evening, emotionally exhausted after his father's illness and death, Gerald sneaks into the Brangwen house to spend the night with Gudrun in her bed, then leaves at dawn.

Later, after Ursula and Rupert's marriage, Gerald suggests that the four of them go to the Alps for Christmas. At their inn in the Alps, Gudrun irritates Gerald with her interest in Loerke, a gay German sculptor. An artist herself, Gudrun is fascinated with Loerke's idea that brutality is necessary to create art. While Gerald grows increasingly jealous and angry, Gudrun only derides and ridicules him. Finally, he can endure it no longer. After attempting to strangle her, he trudges off into the cold, to commit suicide and die alone. Rupert and Ursula return to their cottage in England. Rupert grieves for his dead friend. As Ursula and Rupert discuss love, Ursula says there can't be two kinds of love. He explains that she is enough for love of a woman but there is another eternal love and bond for a man.

== Cast ==
- Alan Bates as Rupert Birkin
- Oliver Reed as Gerald Crich
- Glenda Jackson as Gudrun Brangwen
- Jennie Linden as Ursula Brangwen
- Eleanor Bron as Hermione Roddice
- Alan Webb as Thomas Crich
- James Laurenson as Minister
- Catherine Willmer as Mrs. Christianna Crich
- Phoebe Nicholls as Winifred Crich
- Sharon Gurney as Laura Crich
- Christopher Gable as Tibby Lupton
- Michael Gough as Mr. Tom Brangwen
- Norma Shebbeare as Mrs. Brangwen
- Michael Garratt as Maestro
- Richard Heffer as Loerke's friend
- Michael Graham Cox as Palmer
- Vladek Sheybal as Loerke
- Niké Arrighi as Contessa

== Production ==
=== Development ===
Larry Kramer was an American who moved to London in 1961 to work as an assistant story editor at Columbia and had become an assistant to David Picker at United Artists. United Artists wanted Kramer to move to New York but he wanted to live in London and produce, so he quit his job. He went to work on 1967's Here We Go Round the Mulberry Bush as producer and ended up rewriting the script.

He was looking for another project when Silvio Narizzano, who had directed the successful Georgy Girl (1966), suggested Kramer make a film of Women in Love. Kramer read the novel, loved it, and optioned the screen rights for $4,200. He wrote a screen treatment based on the chapters and succeeded in selling the project to David Chasman and David Picker at United Artists.

=== Script ===
Kramer originally commissioned a screenplay from David Mercer. Mercer's adaptation differed too much from the original book and he was bought out of the project. "It was a horrible Marxist tract," Kramer said. "Just horrible. I had no script and no more money for another writer.

Ultimately, Kramer wrote the script, although he had not written one before. "I became a writer not by choice but out of necessity," he said.

Kramer said "slightly more than half the film" was directly from the novel. He took the rest from various sources including Lawrence's letters, essays, poems and plays.

"I wanted to show you can convey emotion along with action and that ideas and talk and beautiful scenery are not incompatible in films," said Kramer. "My first draft was all dialog, the second was mostly visual. The end result was a combination of both."

=== Russell as director ===
Narizzano, intended as director, left the project after suffering a series of personal setbacks. He divorced his wife for a man who died soon after. After Narizzano's departure, Kramer considered a number of directors to take on the project, including Jack Clayton, Stanley Kubrick and Peter Brook, all of whom declined.

Ken Russell had previously directed only two films, and was better known for his biographical projects about artists for the BBC. His second film, Billion Dollar Brain was admired by Chasman and Picker at UA, who told him "they thought it got a raw deal from right wing critics and that I could do better with a more sympathetic subject." Chasman and Picker sent a copy of Kramer's script to Russell, who liked it. The director read the novel, which he loved; he called Women in Love "probably the best English novel ever written." He and Kramer collaborated on further drafts of the script, using information from Lawrence's own life and adding extra bits from the novel. This included adding the nude wrestling scene. "It wasn't in the original script," wrote Russell. "I didn't think it would pass the censor and I knew it would be difficult to shoot. I was wrong on my first guess and right on my second. Olly [Oliver Reed] talked me into it. He wrestled with me, jujitsu style, in my kitchen, and wouldn't let me up until I said, 'OK, OK, you win, I'll do it.'"

By the time United Artists approved the script, the project had a second producer, Martin Rosen.

=== Casting ===
Russell says casting was "difficult" in part because most of his television work was done with non-actors so he was "totally out of touch to the real talent at hand."

Kramer had been talking to Alan Bates about playing Birkin for a number of years and he was cast relatively easily. Bates sported a beard, giving him a physical resemblance to D. H. Lawrence.

Michael Caine, who had just made Billion Dollar Brain with Russell, says he was offered a lead role but turned it down because he felt unable to do the nude scene.

Kramer wanted Edward Fox for the role of Gerald. Fox fitted Lawrence's description of the character ("blond, glacial and Nordic"), but United Artists, the studio financing the production, imposed Oliver Reed, a more bankable star, as Gerald even though he was not physically like Lawrence's description of the character. Russell had worked with Reed before and said even though the actor "wasn't ideal physically for the part he couldn't have played it better."

Kramer was adamant to give the role of Gudrun to Glenda Jackson. She was, then, well recognised in theatrical circles. As a member of the Royal Shakespeare Company she had gained a great deal of attention as Charlotte Corday in Marat/Sade. United Artists was unconvinced, considering her not conventionally beautiful enough for the role of Gudrun, who drives Gerald to suicide. Russell was unimpressed when he met Jackson and says only in seeing Marat/Sade "did I realise what a magnificent screen personality she is."

The last of the four main roles to be cast was that of Ursula. Both Vanessa Redgrave and Faye Dunaway declined to take the role, finding it the less interesting of the two sisters and that they would be easily eclipsed by Glenda Jackson's acting skills. It was by accident that Russell and Kramer came upon a screen test that Jennie Linden had made opposite Peter O'Toole for The Lion in Winter, for a part she did not get. Linden had recently given birth to her only son and was not eager to take the role but was persuaded by Kramer and Russell.

Bates and Reed received a percentage of the profits while Linden and Jackson were paid a straight salary.

The composer Michael Garrett, who also contributed to the score, can be seen playing the piano in one scene.

=== Shooting ===
Filming started 25 September 1968 and took place in northern England and Switzerland. The opening scene with credits was shot at what is now Crich Tramway Museum in Derbyshire. It took sixteen weeks and was budgeted at $1.65 million but came in at $1.5 million "because everyone was helpful," says Kramer, including key participants taking a percentage. Jackson was pregnant during filming.

The film features a famous nude wrestling scene between Bates and Reed. Kramer says Reed turned up to the shoot drunk and got Bates drunk. "I had to get drunk before I exposed myself on camera," said Reed.

The wrestling scene caused the film to be banned altogether in Turkey.

Russell said he regretted omitting a scene where the sisters went to London "where they sample la vie boheme. It helped form their characters and explains their subsequent behaviour. At least two of the actors were miscast while another had to be replaced after his second appearance. But none of that matters when a movie turns you on. You can have brilliant camerawork, great editing, a fine script and good acting, but it don't mean a thing if it ain't got that swing."

=== Russell's view of the film ===
Russell later wrote "I've made better films than Women in Love but obviously it had something that tickled the public's fancy, and it wasn't just the male members of Messrs Bates and Reed. It might have probed intimacy between the sexes as few movies had before, but I can take scant credit for that. I was only putting on the screen what D. H. Lawrence had written half a century before. But the film did have some excellent performances...and both Alan and Olly really came to grips with the subject, especially in the nude wrestling scene."

== Release and reception ==
=== Censorship ===
The film was passed uncut by the British censor.

=== Box office ===
The film was one of the eight most popular films at the British box office in 1970. As it cost $1.6 million, it recouped its costs in England alone. It made $3.0 million in rentals in the U.S. and Canada and made $4.5 million worldwide.

=== Critical response ===
The Monthly Film Bulletin wrote: "It is hard to imagine what a completely faithful translation of Lawrence would look like, or even if it would be at all watchable. Women in Love has peopled an authentic landscape with the right faces and a 'crowded canvas' of detail in the hope that the author's vision will inevitably shine through. The result is no more or less successful than the rather different approach to the smaller task of adaptation in The Fox. On the strength of it, Women in Love probably deserves as kind a reception as The Fox and is certainly more enjoyable than Joseph Strick's aesthetically grinding and all too willed adaptation of selections from Ulysses." Pauline Kael wrote: "Ken Russell's movie could perhaps be described as a gothic sex fantasy on themes from D. H. Lawrence's novel. Visually and emotionally, it's extravagant and, from time to time, impressive ... The movie is a highly colored swirl of emotional impressions, bursting with intensity that isn't really grounded in anything."

Women in Love holds an 83% rating on review aggregator website Rotten Tomatoes, based on 23 reviews with an average rating of 7.5/10. Film critic Emanuel Levy has said of the film: "Though deviating from D. H. Lawrence's novel considerably, this is Ken Russell's most fully-realised narrative film, lavishly mounted and well-acted, especially by Glenda Jackson in an Oscar-winning performance."

== Accolades ==
Award	Category	Nominee(s)	Result	Ref.
Academy Awards	Best Director	Ken Russell	Nominated	
Academy Awards	Best Actress	Glenda Jackson	Won	
Academy Awards	Best Screenplay – Based on Material from Another Medium	Larry Kramer	Nominated	
Academy Awards	Best Cinematography	Billy Williams	Nominated	
British Academy Film Awards	Best Film	Ken Russell	Nominated	
British Academy Film Awards	Best Direction	Ken Russell	Nominated	
British Academy Film Awards	Best Actor in a Leading Role	Alan Bates	Nominated	
British Academy Film Awards	Best Actress in a Leading Role	Glenda Jackson	Nominated	
British Academy Film Awards	Best Screenplay	Larry Kramer	Nominated	
British Academy Film Awards	Best Art Direction	Luciana Arrighi	Nominated	
British Academy Film Awards	Best Cinematography	Billy Williams	Nominated	
British Academy Film Awards	Best Costume Design	Shirley Ann Russell	Nominated	
British Academy Film Awards	Best Original Film Music	Georges Delerue	Nominated	
British Academy Film Awards	Best Soundtrack	Terry Rawlings	Nominated	
British Academy Film Awards	Most Promising Newcomer to Leading Film Roles	Jennie Linden	Nominated	
Golden Globe Awards	Best Foreign Film – English-Language		Won	
Golden Globe Awards	Best Actress in a Motion Picture – Drama	Glenda Jackson	Nominated	
Golden Globe Awards	Best Director – Motion Picture	Ken Russell	Nominated	
Laurel Awards	Best Female Dramatic Performance	Glenda Jackson	5th Place	
National Board of Review Awards	Top Ten Films		3rd Place	
National Board of Review Awards	Best Actress	Glenda Jackson	Won	
National Society of Film Critics Awards	Best Actress	Glenda Jackson	Won	
New York Film Critics Circle Awards	Best Actress	Glenda Jackson	Won	

== Home media ==
Women in Love was released on VHS by MGM Home Entertainment in 1990, and on DVD in Regions 1 and 2 in 2003. The film was released on Blu-ray and DVD by the Criterion Collection on 27 March 2018, with the Blu-ray featuring a restored 4K digital transfer. The supplementary materials on the Criterion release include audio commentaries and various interviews, along with the 1972 short film Second Best, produced by and starring Alan Bates, based on a story by D. H. Lawrence.

== See also ==
- BFI Top 100 British films
