= The Wild Child =

1970 film by François Truffaut

- Theatrical release poster
- French: L'Enfant sauvage
- Directed by: François Truffaut
- Screenplay by: François Truffaut; Jean Gruault
- Based on: The Memorandum and Report on Victor de l'Aveyron by Jean Marc Gaspard Itard
- Produced by: Marcel Berbert
- Starring: Jean-Pierre Cargol; François Truffaut; Françoise Seigner; Jean Dasté
- Cinematography: Néstor Almendros
- Edited by: Agnès Guillemot
- Production company: Les Films du Carrosse
- Distributed by: Les Artistes Associés
- Release date: February 26, 1970 (France)
- Running time: 85 minutes
- Country: France
- Languages: French; French Sign Language
- Box office: $800,000; 1,674,771 admissions (France)

The Wild Child (French: L'Enfant sauvage, released in the United Kingdom as The Wild Boy) is a 1970 French historical drama film co-written, directed by, and starring François Truffaut. It is based on the true events regarding Victor of Aveyron (Jean-Pierre Cargol), a late 18th-century French child who spent the first eleven or twelve years of his life with little or no human contact.

The film was released in France on February 26, 1970. It was a critical and commercial success, earning Truffaut several accolades including the Prix Méliès and the National Board of Review Award for Best Director. The film also won the National Society of Film Critics Award for Best Cinematography (for Néstor Almendros).

== Plot ==
One summer day in 1798, a naked boy of 11 or 12 years of age is found in a forest in the rural district of Aveyron in southern France. A woman sees him, then runs off screaming. She finds some hunters and tells them that she saw a wild boy. They hunt him down with a pack of dogs who chase him up a tree and attack him when he falls. He fights them off leaving one dog wounded, then continues to flee and hides in a hole. The dogs continue to follow his scent, eventually finding his hiding place. The hunters arrive and force him out of the hole using smoke to cut off his air supply. After he emerges, the men grab him.

Living like a wild animal and unable to speak or understand language, the child has apparently grown up in solitude in the forest since an early age. He is brought to Paris and initially placed in a school for "deaf-mutes". Dr. Jean Marc Gaspard Itard observes the boy and believes that he is neither deaf nor, as some of his colleagues believe, an "idiot". Itard thinks the boy's behavior is a result of his deprived environment, and that he can be educated.

Itard takes custody of the boy, whom he eventually names Victor, and removes him to his house on the outskirts of Paris. There, under the patient tutelage of the doctor and his housekeeper, Victor gradually becomes socialized and acquires the rudiments of language.

There is a narrow margin between the laws of civilization in rough Parisian life and the brutal laws of life in nature. Victor finds a sort of equilibrium in the windows that mark the transition between the closed interiors and the world outside. But he gains his ability to have social relations by losing his capacity to live as a savage.

== Cast ==
- Jean-Pierre Cargol as Victor of Aveyron
- François Truffaut as Dr. Jean Marc Gaspard Itard
- Françoise Seigner as Madame Guérin
- Paul Villé as Remy
- Jean Dasté as Professor Philippe Pinel
- Pierre Fabre as the Institute attendant
- Claude Miller as Monsieur Lémeri
- Annie Miller as Madame Lémeri
- Nathan Miller as Baby Lémeri
- René Levert as Gendarme
- Jean Mandaroux as the attending doctor
- Mathieu Schiffman as Mathieu
- Jean Gruault as a visitor
- Robert Cambourakis and Jean-François Stévenin as countrymen
- Gitt Magrini as a countrywoman
- Guillaume Schiffman and Eric Dolbert as boys at farm
- Laura Truffaut, Eva Truffaut, Frédérique Dolbert, Tounet Cargol, Dominique Levert, Mlle Théaudiére as girls at farm

== Themes ==
The Wild Child was released in the middle of the "flower child" era, which favored the Romantic idea of the "noble savage" over rationalism and civilization. The term "noble savage" is derived from John Dryden's The Conquest of Granada and the Rousseauian idea of humans as basically good in their most primitive state that had long been championed by Romantics and hippies. Many viewers interpreted the film in this way when first viewing it, but many critics and spectators began to notice that Truffaut seemed to be criticizing the concept of the "noble savage" and taking the side of the rationalists. In a publicity release for the film, Truffaut wrote: "From Romulus and Remus through Mowgli and Tarzan, men have continually been fascinated by tales of beast children. It may be that in these stories of abandoned infants, reared by wolves, bears, or apes, they see a symbol of the extraordinary destiny of our race. Or it may be simply that they harbor a secret hankering after a natural existence." The film critic Mireille Amiel was disappointed by this aspect of the film and by Truffaut, asking: "How can the rebel of The 400 Blows place himself alongside the oppressor, even one as sympathetic as Itard?" and adding "the astonishing thing is that Truffaut the filmmaker is better than Truffaut the man, and that we can accept the interest and beauty of this film at the same time that we're violently opposed to its content." In the film, when Victor is first found he is covered with scars from conflict with other animals in the wild, and Truffaut's interpretation makes it clear that civilization, and especially human communication, is a far better life for Victor than in the wild.

== Production ==
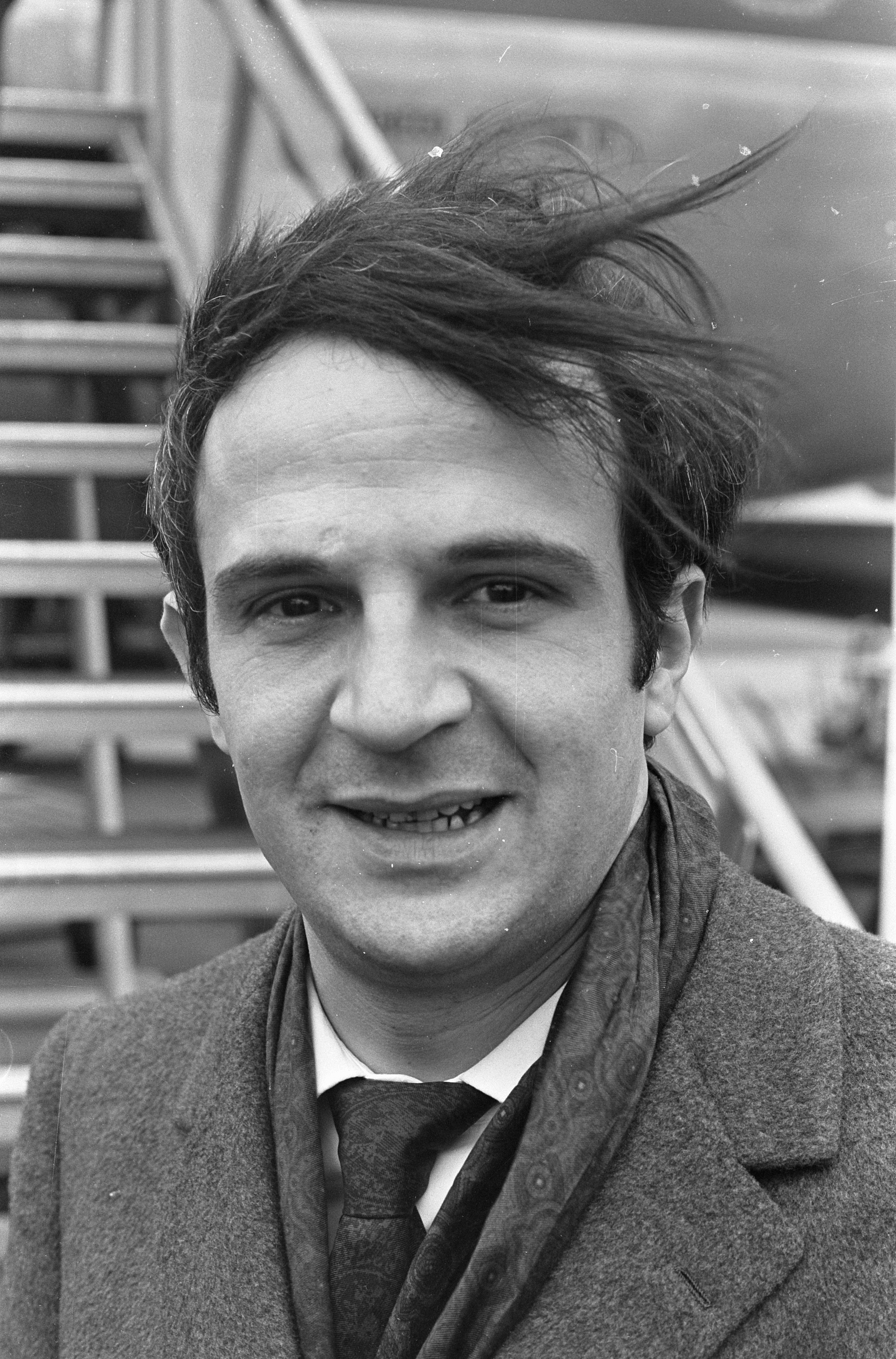
Truffaut (in 1967) read about feral children in a newspaper article and became fascinated with Victor of Aveyron and Dr. Jean Marc Gaspard Itard.

=== Development ===
Truffaut had always felt a strong connection to children, especially outcasts and young people who reject the traditions of society, and frequently used this theme in films such as The 400 Blows and Small Change. In 1962, Truffaut had wanted to make a film based on the play The Miracle Worker; however, Arthur Penn had already obtained the rights and made a film later that year. In 1966, Truffaut read an article in Le Monde by Lucien Malson about feral children, with short examples of 52 such children from 1344 to 1968. Truffaut was especially interested in the story of Victor of Aveyron, The Wild Boy of Aveyron, and began to research the story. The film's script is based upon two reports written by Dr. Itard: one written to the Academy of medicine in 1801 and one written to the French Minister of the Interior in 1806 requesting that the Ministry continue funding Victor's guardian Madame Guérin. Truffaut also studied medical texts and deaf-mutes, as well as books by Maria Montessori and documentaries on autistic children. Dr. Itard's diary was invented by Truffaut and co-screenwriter Jean Gruault in order to give Dr. Itard a more direct voice in the film.

=== Casting ===
After considering several little-known actors, Truffaut decided to play the part of Dr. Itard himself so that he could interact directly with the child actor playing Victor instead of depending on an intermediary. After the film's shooting was completed, he said that he had "the impression not of having acted a role, but simply of having directed the film in front of the camera and not, as usual, from behind it." He later said that "the decision to play Dr. Itard myself is a more complex choice than I believed at the time ... this was the first time I identified myself with the adult, the father, to the extent that at the end of the editing, I dedicated the film to Jean-Pierre Léaud because this passage, this shift became perfectly clear to me." Truffaut later elaborated on the film's autobiographical elements by saying that "I think that Itard is André Bazin and the child Truffaut."

Truffaut had more difficulty casting the role of Victor, knowing that he wanted a child actor who was both talented and suitably undisciplined. He first considered using either an unknown gifted child or the son of a famous celebrity, thinking that a younger version of someone like ballet dancer Rudolf Nureyev would be perfect. Unable to find a suitable actor, he enlisted his assistant to scout young, wild-looking boys at schools in Nîmes and Marseille. One day his assistant spotted a 12-year-old Romani boy named Jean-Pierre Cargol and sent a photograph of and interview with Cargol back to Truffaut, who immediately hired Cargol, who was the nephew of the well-known flamenco guitarist Manitas de Plata.

=== Filming ===
Filming took place on location in the Auvergne region, principally in Aubiat, from July to August 1969, so as not to interrupt Cargol's education. It was Truffaut's first film with cinematographer Néstor Almendros, who went on to work with Truffaut on eight more films. The film included several references to the aesthetics of silent films, such as using an iris shutter to end scenes and filming it in black and white. Truffaut directed first-time actor Cargol by instructing him to pretend to be different animals or people during specific scenes, such as "be like a dog", or "like a horse", or even "like Harpo Marx." During the shoot, Cargol was given a 8mm camera and stated that he would become "the first gypsy director", however Cargol only appeared as an actor in one more film. Truffaut later said that during the making of the film he "saw that the cinema helped his evolution. In my opinion, the difference between Jean-Pierre Cargol before the film and after it is astonishing." Truffaut had scripted a sequence in which Victor is depicted struggling against the harsh weather conditions of winter in the wild, but budgetary limitations forced him to cut out the scenes. The film has very little dialogue and is mostly dominated with Itard's voice-over, making it close to a silent film. The use of iris-ing in and out of Victor not only reinforced the film's affinity with silent films, but often symbolized Victor's coming out of and going into darkness. The film's music was arranged by Antoine Duhamel and consists of music by Antonio Vivaldi.

After filming was completed, Truffaut realized that The Wild Child had a strong connection to his first film The 400 Blows, not just for its depicting of frustrated children but because it mirrored his experience working with then first time actor Jean-Pierre Léaud. Truffaut said that "I was reliving somewhat the shooting of The 400 Blows, during which I initiated Jean-Pierre Léaud into cinema. I basically taught him what cinema was." Truffaut then decided to dedicate the film to Léaud. He later added that he "realized that L"Enfant sauvage is bound up with both Les Quatre Cent Coups and Fahrenheit 451. In Les Quatre Cents Coups I showed a child who missed being loved, who grows up without tenderness; in Fahrenheit 451 it was a man who longed for books, that is, culture. With Victor of Aveyron, what is missing is something more essential – language." Truffaut also considered the making of the film to be a growing experience for him as a person and as a filmmaker, stating that "until The Wild Child, when I had children in my films, I identified with them, but here, for the first time, I identified with the adult, the father." After the film was released, Truffaut told a reporter: "I did not want to spell out my message. It is simply this: man is nothing without other men."

== Release ==
The film sold nearly 1.5 million tickets in France.

=== Home media ===
The Wild Child was released on DVD by MGM Home Entertainment as part of their World Films collection on July 24, 2001. This release featured the film's original theatrical trailer as well as English, French and Spanish subtitles.

== Critical reception ==
Film critic Roger Ebert gave the film a positive review and discussed the film's theme as one of Truffaut's favorites. He wrote, "The story is essentially true, drawn from an actual case in 18th Century France, and Truffaut tells it simply and movingly. It becomes his most thoughtful statement on his favorite subject: The way young people grow up, explore themselves, and attempt to function creatively in the world... Truffaut places his personal touch on every frame of the film. He wrote it, directed it, and plays the doctor himself. It is an understated, compassionate performance, a perfect counterpoint to Jean-Pierre Cargol's ferocity and fear... So often movies keep our attention by flashy tricks and cheap melodrama; it is an intellectually cleansing experience to watch this intelligent and hopeful film."

The staff at Variety also praised the drama, and wrote: "This is a lucid, penetrating detailing of a young doctor's attempt to civilize a retarded boy found living in the woods in Southern France in the 18th century. Though based on a true case [Jean Itard's Memoire et Rapport sur Victor de L'Aveyron, published in 1806], it eschews didactics and creates a poetic, touching and dignified relationship between the doctor and his savage charge... It progresses slowly but absorbingly. Truffaut underplays but exudes an interior tenderness and dedication. The boy is amazingly and intuitively well played by a tousled gypsy tyke named Jean-Pierre Cargol. Everybody connected with this unusual, off-beat film made in black-and-white rates kudos."

Film critic Vincent Canby liked the acting, and wrote: "The Wild Child is not the sort of movie in which individual performances can be easily separated from the rest of the film, but young Cargol, who early in the film looks and sounds like a Mediterranean Patty Duke, responds with marvelous, absolute faith to his costar and director, Truffaut, who himself performs with humane, just slightly self-conscious cool."

Stanley Kauffmann of The New Republic described The Wild Child as "neither a banal disaster nor a symbolic triumph".

Robert Geller wrote that "...the child's humanity and pathos are not terribly removed from the increasing numbers of young teens and half-primitives who wander drugged and aimlessly, and sleep in alleys and doorwells throughout America in...Market Place, Sunset Boulevard and Times Square...[The film provides teenagers with meaty material for discussion of] what they themselves have to give up in order to get what they may no longer think is worth getting."

Contemporary film critics have continued to praise the film. Jonathan Rosenbaum called it one of Truffaut's best films, "albeit one of his darkest and most conservative." Ty Burr said: "Nearly four decades after its release, The Wild Child remains startling for its humane clarity, for Nestor Almendros's brilliant black-and-white photography, and for the sense that Truffaut is achieving filmmaking mastery on a very small scale."

Terrence Malick is an admirer of the film, and hired its cinematographer Néstor Almendros to shoot Days of Heaven.

=== Awards and nominations ===
| Award | Year | Category | Nominee | Result |
|---|---|---|---|---|
| French Syndicate of Cinema Critics | 1971 | Prix Méliès | The Wild Child | Won |
| Laurel Awards | 1971 | Best Foreign Film | The Wild Child | Nominated |
| National Board of Review Awards | 1971 | Best Director | François Truffaut | Won |
| National Board of Review Awards | 1971 | Best Foreign Language Film | The Wild Child | Won |
| National Board of Review Awards | 1971 | Top Foreign Language Films | The Wild Child | Won |
| National Society of Film Critics Awards | 1970 | Best Film | The Wild Child | 3rd |
| National Society of Film Critics Awards | 1970 | Best Director | François Truffaut | 2nd |
| National Society of Film Critics Awards | 1970 | Best Screenplay | Jean Gruault, François Truffaut | 4th |
| National Society of Film Critics Awards | 1970 | Best Cinematography | Néstor Almendros | Won |

== See also ==
- Victor of Aveyron
