= Opera Nazionale Montessori =

Opera Nazionale Montessori (ONM) is an Italian cultural institution and publishing house established on 8 August 1924. Based in Rome, Italy, it is an organisation for research, training, consultancy and dissemination of Montessorian scientific and methodological principles and ideals.

In line with the original intentions of its founder, Maria Montessori, ONM has the task of preserving and disseminating her thought and work, of developing the historic and scientific heritage, and of guaranteeing the ideals and practice of her methods.

ONM is active in the education field by promoting initiatives, at national and international level, for training, research and exchange with various institutional bodies. It has ongoing relations with the Italian Ministry of Education, Ministry of Foreign Affairs and of Social Policies, as well as universities, research and training centres, professional associations and the media.

== Publications in English ==
- Chiaravalle Montessori Nursery School and House of Children. Help for Life
- Joint edition by the Chiaravalle City Council and ONM.
- Author: Anna Maria Ferrati

- A Journey Around A Montessori Nursery School
- Author: Laura Franceschini

- A Journey Around a Children’s House
- Preface by Antonio Fazio (Governor of the Bank of Italy)
- Author: Carla Cevenini

- The Child is the Father of the Man
- Author: Silvana Quattrocchi Montanaro

- Proposed Manifesto for a Neo-Montessori Structuralist Pedagogy
- Author: Mauro Laeng
- The Fairy Tale of Life
- A tale to help adults understand the child’s peculiarities and potentials.
- Author: Augusto Scocchera

- Music and the Montessori Method
- A guidebook on music teaching supported by practices of the Montessori method.
- Author: Isenarda De Napoli

- Montessori. International Bibliography 1896-2000
- Over 14,000 records documenting the impact Maria Montessori had all over the world.
- The bibliographic items refer to 56 countries.
- Edited by Clara Tornar

- The Montessori Nursery Charter
- The principles of Montessori education from birth: a tool for educators and directors.
- Opera Nazionale Montessori

- Maria Montessori's First Children's House
- Authors: Salvatore Valitutti, Manuela Iannello, Giuseppe Di Millo and Maria Angela Grassi

- Man According to Maria Montessori. From Love-Teaching Child to Peace-Loving Adult
- Proceedings of the International Congress Rome 16/17 May - Chiaravalle 18/19 May 2002

== Educational institutions run by ONM ==
- Since 1971 - a “House of Children” with an attached nursery for the children of the employees of the Bank of Italy. Approximately 145 children attend the school and are assisted by a team of 38 including educators and other staff. (Rome, Largo Bastia 1).
- Since 1972 - a nursery school, a "House of Children" and a Montessori primary school recognised by the Ministry of Education. About 216 children attend the school and are assisted by a team of 29 including educators and other staff (Castellanza - VA, Via Cantoni 6).
- Since 2000 - a crèche for the children of the employees of the European Investment Bank. The school is attended by approximately 84 children belonging to three different language groups, assisted by a team of 30 including educators and other staff. (Luxembourg, 2 rue Marguerite de Busbach).
- Since 2000 - a state nursery school attended by about 23 children assisted by a team of 5 including educators and other staff (Rome, Via Nomentana 54).
- Since 2002 - a nursery school for the children of the employees of the Bank of Italy, attended by about 100 children assisted by a team of 38 including educators and other staff (Rome, Largo Volumnia 2).
- Since 2005 - a nursery school for the children of the employees of the Ministry of Economic Development. About 13 children attend the school and are assisted by a team of 3 including educators and other staff (Rome, Via Molise 2).

Note:

- Nursery schools are for children aged from 3 months to 3 years;
- Crèches are for children aged from 3 months to 4 years;
- A "House of Children" is the Montessorian term referring to a school that welcomes children from 2 and a half to 6 years of age.
