= Billy Williams (cinematographer) =

British cinematographer (1929–2025)

- Born: William Desmond Williams; 3 June 1929; Walthamstow, London, England
- Died: 20 May 2025 (aged 95)
- Occupation: Cinematographer

William Desmond Williams (3 June 1929 – 20 May 2025) was a British cinematographer.

Williams was responsible for shooting a number of films, including Women in Love (1969), On Golden Pond (1981) and Gandhi (1982), for which he won an Academy Award.

== Early life ==
Williams was born in Walthamstow in 1929. His father was a cinematographer. Williams left school at the age of 14, having failed the 11 plus; his father offered him an apprenticeship. Williams joined his father, also named Billy, as an apprentice cameraman, remaining with him for four years.

== Career ==
When he was eighteen, he spent two years in the RAF as a photographer. On leaving the RAF, he obtained a job with British Transport Films (BTF), filming all forms of transportation as an assistant cameraman for five years.

After this, Williams spent his entire savings on an Arriflex IIC 35mm film camera and went to Iraq (where he later shot the opening scenes to The Exorcist, 1973), filming for the Iraq Petroleum Company. He spent several years in documentary work, hoping that one day he could break into features.

In the 1950s, Williams joined the television advertising industry under producer James Garrett. Beginning as an operator and then as the in-house director of photography (DP), John Schlesinger and Ken Russell, who offered him his first feature film Billion Dollar Brain (1967).

In 1965, he shot his first feature as director of photography (San Ferry Ann), having by-passed the focus puller and operator stages. He made several others before shooting Billion Dollar Brain with Russell in 1967.

Williams worked again with Russell on his most notable film, Women in Love (1969), which won Oscar and BAFTA nominations as well as international acclaim. He then worked with John Schlesinger on Sunday Bloody Sunday (1971), which earned another BAFTA nomination.

He can be seen in a cameo in the film The Wind and the Lion (1975), playing a British nobleman living in Tangier who is killed in a shootout with Sean Connery's Berber tribesmen. He also appeared with Cher in 1987's Suspect.

On Golden Pond (1981) earned Williams his second Oscar nomination, and the following year he finally won the Oscar for Gandhi (1982), shared with Ronnie Taylor.

Other films Williams worked on include: Voyage of the Damned (1976), Saturn 3 (1980), Dreamchild (1985) and The Rainbow (1989).

Williams retired on New Year's Day 1996. Since retirement, he had travelled, conducting workshops on film. He was appointed Officer of the Order of the British Empire (OBE) in the 2009 Birthday Honours. Williams is featured in the book Conversations with Cinematographers by David A. Ellis, published by Scarecrow Press.

Williams died on 20 May 2025, at the age of 95.

== Selected filmography ==
- 1965: San Ferry Ann
- 1967: Billion Dollar Brain
- 1968: 30 Is a Dangerous Age, Cynthia
- 1968: The Magus
- 1969: Women in Love
- 1970: Tam Lin
- 1971: Sunday Bloody Sunday
- 1972: Pope Joan
- 1973: The Glass Menagerie
- 1973: The Exorcist (opening scenes only)
- 1975: The Wind and the Lion
- 1976: Voyage of the Damned
- 1977: The Devil's Advocate
- 1978: The Silent Partner
- 1979: Going in Style
- 1981: On Golden Pond
- 1982: Gandhi
- 1983: The Survivors
- 1984: Ordeal by Innocence
- 1985: Dreamchild
- 1987: Suspect
- 1989: The Rainbow
- 1990: Stella
- 1992: Shadow of the Wolf
