= Jean Marc Gaspard Itard =

French physician (1774–1838)

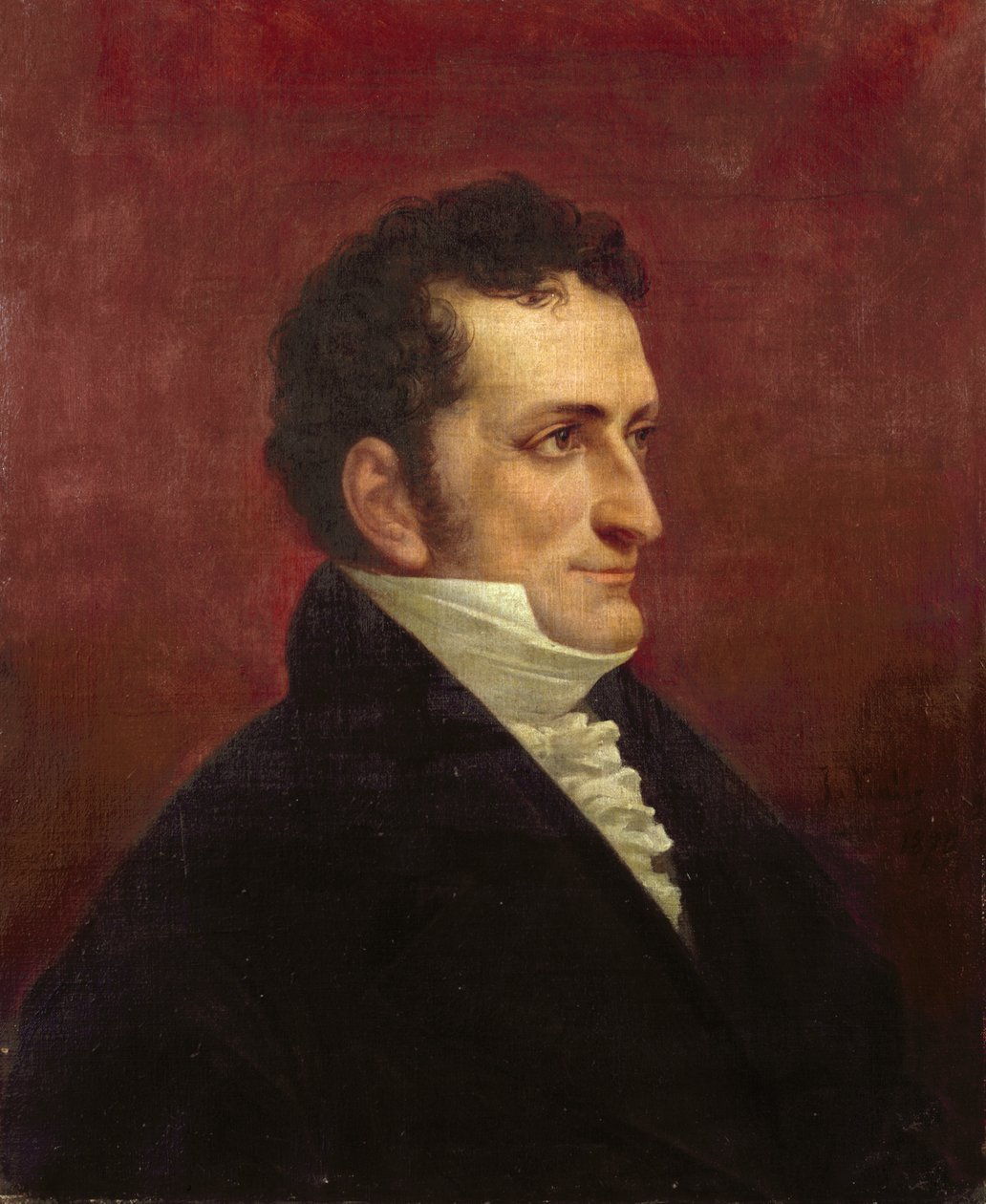
Jean Itard (19th Century painting)

Jean Marc Gaspard Itard (24 April 1774, Oraison, Alpes-de-Haute-Provence – 5 July 1838, Paris) was a French medical doctor born in Provence. He is perhaps best known for his work with Victor of Aveyron.

== Career ==
Itard, without a university education and working at a Marseilles bank, was forced to enter the army during the French Revolution, but presented himself as a physician at that time. After working as a health officer at a military hospital in Soliers, he was given the role of surgeon third class in the Army of Italy.

In 1796, he was appointed deputy surgeon at Val-de-Grâce (Hôpital d'instruction des armées du Val-de-Grâce) military hospital in Paris. Itard became a surgeon second class after taking courses in medicine under Phillipe Pinel, director of La Salpêtrière, and completing his thesis.

In 1799, physician at the Institution Nationale des Sourds-Muets à Paris. There, Itard was known to conduct torturous experiments on the deaf students in useless attempts to restore their hearing, including delivering electrical shocks, leech therapy, ear surgeries, and various types of internal and external medicinal applications.

== Victor of Aveyron ==
Itard is known as an educator of the deaf, and tried his educational theories in the celebrated case of Victor of Aveyron, dramatised in the 1970 motion picture The Wild Child directed by François Truffaut, who also played Itard. However, he was disappointed with the progress he made with Victor.

=== René Laennec ===
In Paris, Itard was a student of physician René Laennec, inventor of the stethoscope (in 1816). Laennec was a few years younger but received a formal education at the University of Nantes and later became a lecturer and professor of medicine at the Collège de France. Itard described pneumothorax in 1803; Laennec would provide a fuller description of the condition in 1819.

=== Other works ===
In 1821, Itard published a major work on otology, describing the results of his medical research based on over 170 detailed cases. He is credited with inventing a Eustachian catheter referred to as "Itard's catheter". Numbness in the tympanic membrane during otosclerosis has the eponymous name of "Itard-Cholewa Symptom".

In 1825, as the head physician at the Institution Royale des sourds-muets, Itard was credited with describing the first case of Tourette syndrome in Marquise de Dampierre, a woman of nobility.

On 5 July 1838, at the age of 64, Jean Marc Gaspard Itard died in Paris, France.

== Influence on special education ==
In 1837, shortly before his death, Itard directed Édouard Séguin in educating a child with intellectual disabilities and encouraged him to devote himself to the work. Séguin later developed the first systematic method for educating such children. Maria Montessori studied Itard's and Séguin's methods, prepared handwritten Italian translations of their works, and applied their approach at the Orthophrenic School in Rome in 1900–1901.

== Works ==
- Itard, Jean Marc Gaspard (1802). An Historical Account of the Discovery and Education of a Savage Man, Or of the First Developments, Physical and Moral, of the Young Savage Caught in the Woods Near Aveyron, in the Year 1798. London: Richard Phillips.
- Itard, Jean Marc Gaspard (1821). Traité des maladies de l'oreille et de l'audition, Tome premier (in French). Paris: Méquignon-Marvis.
- Itard, Jean Marc Gaspard (1821). Traité des maladies de l'oreille et de l'audition, Tome second (in French). Paris: Méquignon-Marvis.
- Itard, Jean Marc Gaspard (July 1825). "Mémoire sur quelques fonctions involontaires des appareils de la locomotion, de la préhension et de la voix". Archives générales de médecine (in French). 3 (8): 385–407.
