= Maria Montessori =

Italian physician and educator (1870–1952)

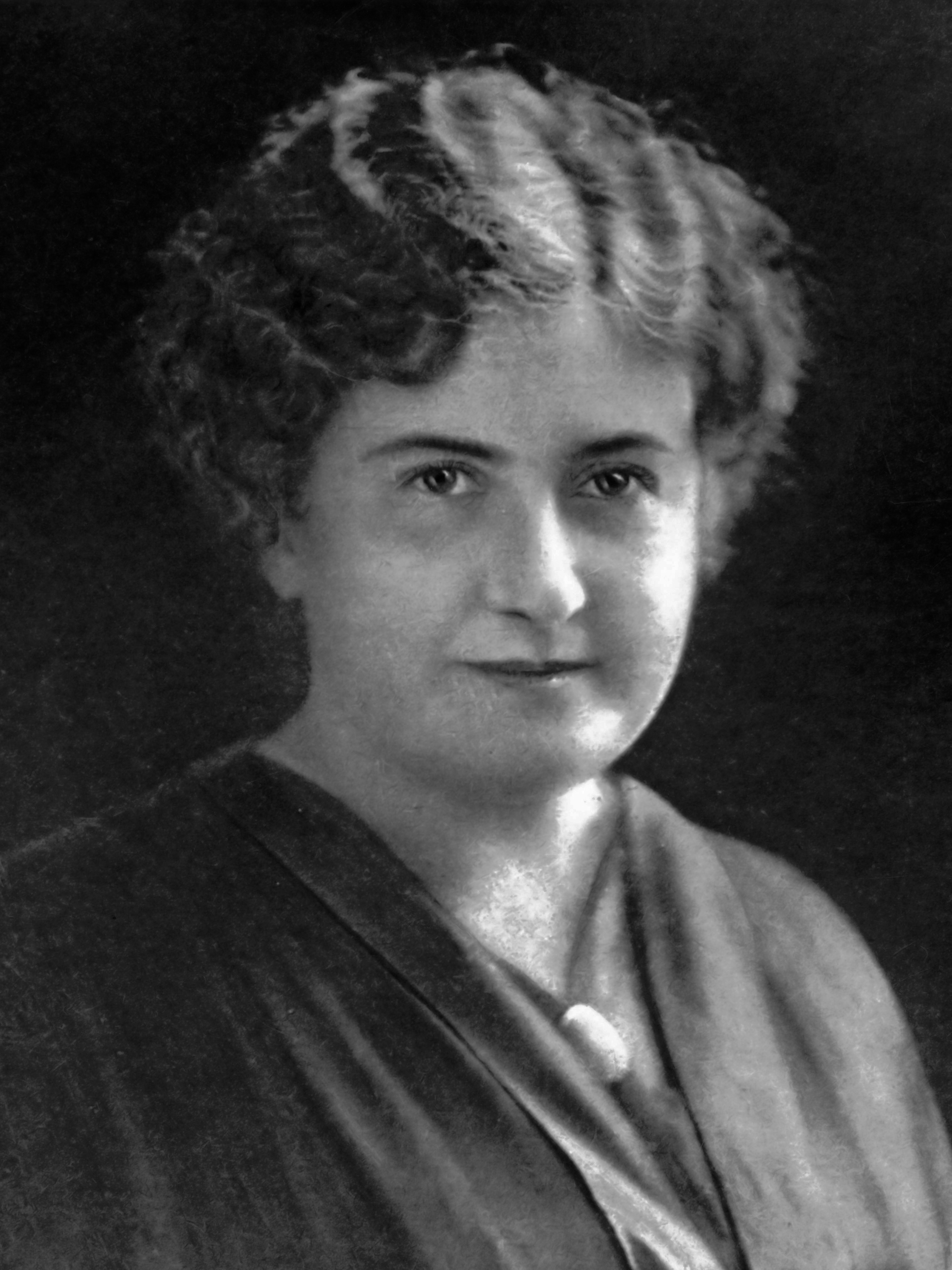
- Portrait of Montessori, artist and date unknown
- Born: Maria Tecla Artemisia Montessori; 31 August 1870; Chiaravalle, Marche, Kingdom of Italy
- Died: 6 May 1952 (aged 81); Noordwijk, Netherlands
- Education: University of Rome La Sapienza Medical School
- Occupations: Physician; educator
- Known for: Founder of the Montessori method of education
- Children: 1

Maria Tecla Artemisia Montessori (/ˌmɒntɪˈsɔːri/ MON-tiss-OR-ee; Italian: [maˈriːa montesˈsɔːri]; 31 August 1870 – 6 May 1952) was an Italian physician and educator best known for her philosophy of education (the Montessori method) and her writing on scientific pedagogy. At an early age, Montessori enrolled in classes at an all-boys technical school, with hopes of becoming an engineer. She soon had a change of heart and began medical school at the Sapienza University of Rome, becoming one of the first women to attend medical school in Italy; she graduated with honors in 1896. Her educational method is in use globally in many public and private schools.

== Life and career ==
=== Birth and family ===
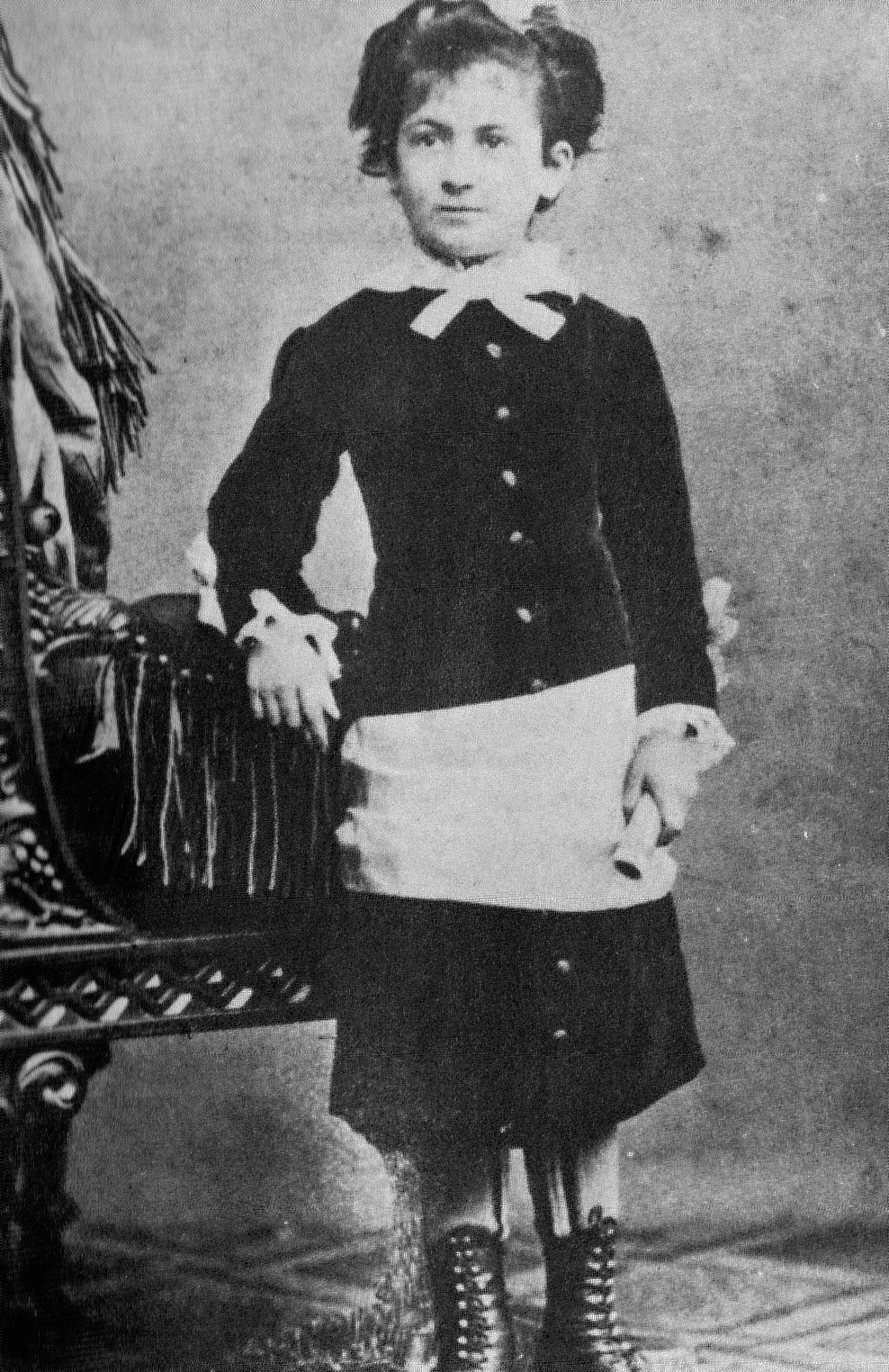
Montessori, c. 1880

Montessori was born on 31 August 1870 in Chiaravalle, in the province of Ancona, Italy. Her father, Alessandro Montessori, age 33, was an official of the Ministry of Finance working in the local state-run tobacco factory. Her mother, Renilde Stoppani, 25 years old, was well-educated for the times and was the niece of Italian geologist and paleontologist Antonio Stoppani. While she did not have any particular mentor, she was very close to her mother who readily encouraged her. She also had a loving relationship with her father, although he disagreed with her choice to continue her education.

=== 1883–1896: Education ===
==== Early education ====
Because of her father's work, the family frequently moved during Montessori's childhood. The Montessori family moved to Florence in 1873, then to Rome in 1875. Montessori entered a public elementary school at the age of 6 in 1876. Her early school record was "not particularly noteworthy", although she was awarded certificates for good behavior in the first grade and for lavori donneschi, or "women's work", the next year. When a teacher asked her class to present the lives of famous women the children wanted to imitate, young Montessori reportedly said, "I shall never be that. I care too much for the children of the future to add yet another biography to the list".

==== Secondary school ====
In 1883, or 1884, at the age of 13, Montessori entered a secondary, technical school, Regia Scuola Tecnica Michelangelo Buonarroti, where she studied Italian, arithmetic, algebra, geometry, accounting, history, geography, and sciences. She graduated in 1886 with good grades and examination results. That year, at the age of 16, she continued at the technical institute Regio Istituto Tecnico Leonardo da Vinci, studying Italian, mathematics, history, geography, geometric and ornate drawing, physics, chemistry, botany, zoology, and two foreign languages. She did well in the sciences and especially in mathematics. Initially, she intended to pursue the study of engineering upon graduation, an unusual aspiration for a woman at the time. By the time she graduated in 1890 at the age of 20, with a certificate in physics–mathematics, she had decided to study medicine, a more unlikely pursuit given cultural norms at the time.

==== University of Rome—Medical school ====
Montessori moved forward with her intention to study medicine. She appealed to Guido Baccelli, the professor of clinical medicine at the University of Rome but was strongly discouraged. In 1890, she enrolled in the University of Rome in a degree course in natural sciences, passing examinations in botany, zoology, experimental physics, histology, anatomy, and general and organic chemistry, and earning her diploma di licenza in 1892. This degree, along with additional studies in Italian and Latin, qualified her for entrance into the medical program at the university in 1893.

She was met with hostility and harassment from some medical students and professors because of her gender. Her father also disapproved and wanted her to become a teacher, which was considered the only professional career appropriate to women at the time. Because her attendance of classes with men in the presence of a naked body was deemed inappropriate, she was required to perform her dissections of cadavers alone, after hours. She resorted to smoking tobacco to mask the offensive odor of formaldehyde. Montessori won an academic prize in her first year, and in 1895 secured a position as a hospital assistant, gaining early clinical experience. In her last two years, she studied pediatrics and psychiatry, and worked in the pediatric consulting room and emergency service, becoming an expert in pediatric medicine. Montessori graduated from the University of Rome in 1896 as a doctor of medicine. Her thesis was published in 1897 in the journal Policlinico. She found employment as an assistant at the university hospital and started a private practice.

=== 1896–1901: Early career and family ===
From 1896 to 1901, Montessori worked with and researched "phrenasthenic children"—in modern terms, children experiencing some form of cognitive delay, illness, or disability. She also began to travel, study, speak, and publish nationally and internationally, coming to prominence as an advocate for women's rights and education for children with learning difficulties.

On 31 March 1898, she gave birth to her only child, a son named Mario Montessori (31 March 1898 – 1982). Mario was born out of her love affair with Giuseppe Montesano, a fellow doctor who was co-director with her of the Orthophrenic School of Rome. If Montessori married, she would be expected to cease working professionally. Instead of marriage, Montessori decided to continue her work and studies. Montesano's family also opposed the relationship due to class differences and insisted that the child's birth be kept secret. Montessori agreed under the condition that neither of them would marry anyone else. The name in the child's birth registration was Mario Pipilli, born of unknown parents. When the father of her child was pressured by family to make a more advantageous social connection and subsequently married, Montessori was left feeling betrayed and decided to leave the university hospital. She was forced to place her son in the care of a wet nurse living in the countryside, distraught to miss the first few years of his life. She would later be reunited with her son in his teenage years, where he proved to be a great assistant in her research.

==== Work with children with learning difficulties ====
After graduating from the University of Rome in 1896, she went into private practice and was accepted as a surgical assistant in the university. Montessori also continued with her research at the university's psychiatric clinic. In 1897, as part of her work, she visited asylums in Rome where she observed children with mental disabilities, observations that were fundamental to her future educational work. She also read and studied the works of 19th-century physicians and educators Jean Marc Gaspard Itard and Édouard Séguin, who greatly influenced her work. Montessori was intrigued by Itard's ideas and created a far more specific and organized system for applying them to the everyday education of children with disabilities. When she discovered the works of Itard and Séguin they gave her a new direction in thinking and influenced her to focus on children with learning difficulties. Also in 1897, Montessori audited the university courses in pedagogy and read "all the major works on educational theory of the past two hundred years".

==== Public advocacy ====
In 1897, Montessori spoke on societal responsibility for juvenile delinquency at the National Congress of Medicine in Turin. In 1898, she wrote several articles and spoke again at the First Pedagogical Conference of Turin, urging the creation of special classes and institutions for children with learning difficulties, as well as teacher training for their instructors. In 1899, Montessori was appointed a councilor to the newly formed National League for the Protection of Retarded Children, and was invited to lecture on special methods of education for children with intellectual disabilities at the teacher training school of the College of Rome. That year Montessori undertook a two-week national lecture tour to capacity audiences before prominent public figures. She joined the board of the National League and was appointed as a lecturer in hygiene and anthropology at one of the two teacher-training colleges for women in Italy.

==== Orthophrenic School ====
In 1900 the National League opened the Scuola Magistrale Ortofrenica, or Orthophrenic School, a "medico-pedagogical institute" for training teachers in educating children with learning difficulties, with an attached laboratory classroom. Montessori was appointed co-director. 64 teachers enrolled in the first class, studying psychology, anatomy, and physiology of the nervous system, anthropological measurements, causes and characteristics of mental disability, and special methods of instruction. During her two years at the school, Montessori developed methods and materials which she later adapted to use with mainstream children.

The school was an immediate success, attracting the attention of government officials from the departments of education and health, civic leaders, and prominent figures in the fields of education, psychiatry, and anthropology from the University of Rome. The children in the model classroom were drawn from the asylum and ordinary schools but considered "uneducable" due to their deficiencies. Some of these children later passed public examinations given to so-called "normal" children.

=== 1901–1906: Further studies ===
In 1901, Montessori left the Orthophrenic School and her private practice, and in 1902 she enrolled in the philosophy degree course at the University of Rome; philosophy at the time included much of what is now considered psychology. She studied theoretical and moral philosophy, history of philosophy, and psychology as such, but she did not graduate. She also pursued independent study in anthropology and educational philosophy, conducted observations and experimental research in elementary schools, and revisited the work of Itard and Séguin, preparing handwritten translations of their books into Italian. During this time, she began to consider adapting her methods of educating children with learning difficulties to mainstream education.

Montessori's work developing what she would later call "scientific pedagogy" continued over the next few years. In 1902, Montessori presented a report at a second national pedagogical congress in Naples. She published two articles on pedagogy in 1903, and two more the following year. In 1903 and 1904, she conducted anthropological research with Italian schoolchildren, and in 1904 she was qualified as a free lecturer in anthropology for the University of Rome. She was appointed to lecture in the Pedagogic School at the university and continued in the position until 1908. Her lectures were printed as a book titled Pedagogical Anthropology in 1910.

=== 1906–1911: Casa dei Bambini and the spread of Montessori's ideas ===
==== The first Casa ====
In 1906, Montessori was invited to oversee the care and education of a group of children of working parents in a new apartment building for low-income families in the San Lorenzo district in Rome. Montessori was interested in applying her work and methods to children without mental disabilities, and she accepted. The name Casa dei Bambini, or Children's House, was suggested to Montessori, and the first Casa opened on 6 January 1907, enrolling 50 or 60 children between the ages of two or three and six or seven.

At first, the classroom was equipped with a teacher's table and blackboard, a stove, small chairs, armchairs, and group tables for the children, and a locked cabinet for the materials that Montessori had developed at the Orthophrenic School. Activities for the children included personal care such as dressing and undressing, care of the environment such as dusting and sweeping, and caring for the garden. The children were also shown the use of the materials Montessori had developed. Montessori, occupied with teaching, research, and other professional activities, oversaw and observed the classroom work, but did not teach the children directly. Day-to-day teaching and care were provided, under Montessori's guidance, by the building porter's daughter.

In this first classroom, Montessori observed behaviors in these young children which formed the foundation of her educational method. She noted episodes of deep attention and concentration, multiple repetitions of activity, and a sensitivity to order in the environment. Given a free choice of activity, the children showed more interest in practical activities and Montessori's materials than in toys provided for them and were surprisingly unmotivated by sweets and other rewards. Over time, she saw a spontaneous self-discipline emerge.

Based on her observations, Montessori implemented a number of practices that became hallmarks of her educational philosophy and method. She replaced the heavy furniture with child-sized tables and chairs light enough for the children to move, and placed child-sized materials on low, accessible shelves. She expanded the range of practical activities such as sweeping and personal care to include a wide variety of exercises for the care of the environment and the self, including flower arranging, hand washing, gymnastics, care of pets, and cooking. She also included large open-air sections in the classroom encouraging children to come and go as they please in the room's different areas and lessons. In her book she outlines a typical winter's day of lessons, starting at 09:00 am and finishing at 04:00 pm:

- 9–10. Entrance. Greeting. Inspection as to personal cleanliness. Exercises of practical life; helping one another to take off and put on the aprons. Going over the room to see that everything is dusted and in order. Language: Conversation period: Children give an account of the events of the day before. Religious exercises.
- 10–11. Intellectual exercises. Objective lessons interrupted by short rest periods. Nomenclature, Sense exercises.
- 11–11:30. Simple gymnastics: Ordinary movements done gracefully, normal position of the body, walking, marching in line, salutations, movements for attention, placing of objects gracefully.
- 11:30–12. Luncheon: Short prayer.
- 12–1. Free games.
- 1–2. Directed games, if possible, in the open air. During this period the older children in turn go through with the exercises of practical life, cleaning the room, dusting, putting the material in order. General inspection for cleanliness: Conversation.
- 2–3. Manual work. Clay modelling, design, etc.
- 3–4. Collective gymnastics and songs, if possible in the open air. Exercises to develop forethought: Visiting, and caring for, the plants and animals.

She felt by working independently children could reach new levels of autonomy and become self-motivated to reach new levels of understanding. Montessori also came to believe that acknowledging all children as individuals and treating them as such would yield better learning and fulfilled potential in each particular child.

She continued to adapt and refine the materials she had developed earlier, altering or removing exercises which were chosen less frequently by the children. Based on her observations, Montessori experimented with allowing children free choice of the materials, uninterrupted work, and freedom of movement and activity within the limits set by the environment. She began to see independence as the aim of education, and the role of the teacher as an observer and director of children's innate psychological development.

==== Spread of Montessori education in Italy ====
The first Casa dei Bambini was a success, and a second was opened on 7 April 1907. The children in her programs continued to exhibit concentration, attention, and spontaneous self-discipline, and the classrooms began to attract the attention of prominent educators, journalists, and public figures. In the fall of 1907, Montessori began to experiment with teaching materials for writing and reading—letters cut from sandpaper and mounted on boards, moveable cutout letters, and picture cards with labels. Four- and five-year-old children engaged spontaneously with the materials and quickly gained a proficiency in writing and reading far beyond what was expected for their age. This attracted further public attention to Montessori's work. Three more Case dei Bambini opened in 1908, and in 1909 Italian Switzerland began to replace Froebellian methods with Montessori in orphanages and kindergartens.

In 1909, Montessori held the first teacher training course in her new method in Città di Castello, Italy. In the same year, she described her observations and methods in a book titled Il Metodo della Pedagogia Scientifica Applicato All'Educazione Infantile Nelle Case Dei Bambini (The Method of Scientific Pedagogy Applied to the Education of Children in the Children's Houses). Two more training courses were held in Rome in 1910, and a third in Milan in 1911. Montessori's reputation and work began to spread internationally. Around that time she gave up her medical practice to devote more time to her educational work, developing her methods, and training teachers. In 1919, she resigned from her position at the University of Rome, as her educational work was increasingly absorbing her time and interest.

=== 1909–1915: International recognition and growth of Montessori education ===
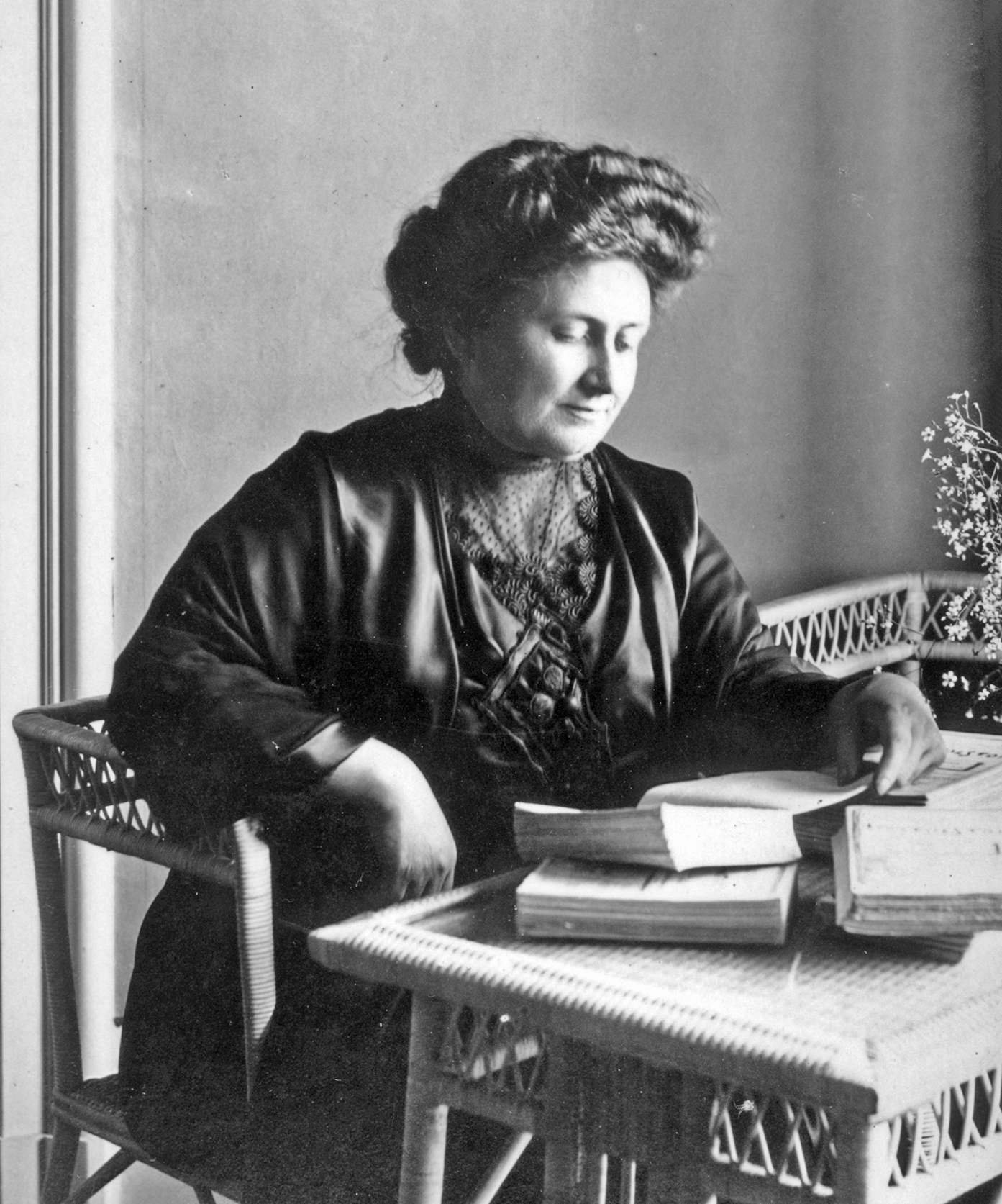
Montessori in 1913

As early as 1909, Montessori's work began to attract the attention of international observers and visitors. Her work was widely published internationally and spread rapidly. By the end of 1911, Montessori education had been officially adopted in public schools in Italy and Switzerland and was planned for the UK. By 1912, Montessori schools had opened in Paris and many other Western European cities, and were planned for Argentina, Australia, China, India, Japan, Korea, Mexico, Switzerland, Syria, the US and New Zealand. Public programs in London, Johannesburg, Rome, and Stockholm had adopted the method in their school systems. Montessori societies were founded in the United States (the Montessori American Committee) and the United Kingdom (the Montessori Society for the United Kingdom). In 1913 the first International Training Course was held in Rome, with a second in 1914.

Montessori's work was widely translated and published during this period. Il Metodo della Pedagogia Scientifica was published in the US as The Montessori Method: Scientific Pedagogy as Applied to Child Education in the Children's Houses, where it became a best seller. British and Swiss editions followed. A revised Italian edition was published in 1913. Russian and Polish editions came out in 1913, and German, Japanese, and Romanian editions appeared in 1914, followed by Spanish (1915), Dutch (1916), and Danish (1917) editions. Pedagogical Anthropology was published in English in 1913. In 1914, Montessori published, in English, Doctor Montessori's Own Handbook, a practical guide to the didactic materials she had developed.

==== Montessori in the United States ====
In 1911 and 1912, Montessori's work was popular and widely publicized in the US, especially in a series of articles in McClure's Magazine. The first North American Montessori school was opened in October 1911, in Tarrytown, New York. The inventor Alexander Graham Bell and his wife became proponents of the method and a second school was opened in their Canadian home. The Montessori Method sold quickly through six editions. The first International Training Course in Rome in 1913 was sponsored by the American Montessori Committee, and 67 of the 83 students were from the US. By 1913 there were more than 100 Montessori schools in the country. Montessori traveled to the United States in December 1913 on a three-week lecture tour which included films of her European classrooms, meeting with large, enthusiastic crowds wherever she traveled.

Montessori returned to the US in 1915, sponsored by the National Education Association, to demonstrate her work at the Panama–Pacific International Exposition in San Francisco, California, and to give a third international training course. A glass-walled classroom was installed at the Exposition, and thousands of observers came to see a class of 21 students. Montessori's father died in November 1915, and she returned to Italy.

Although Montessori and her educational approach were popular in the US, she was not without opposition and controversy. Influential progressive educator William Heard Kilpatrick, a follower of American philosopher and educational reformer John Dewey, wrote a dismissive and critical book titled The Montessori System Examined, which had a broad impact. The National Kindergarten Association was critical as well. Critics charged that Montessori's method was outdated, overly rigid, overly reliant on sense-training, and left too little scope for imagination, social interaction, and play. In addition, Montessori's insistence on tight control over the elaboration of her method, the training of teachers, the production and use of materials, and the establishment of schools became a source of conflict and controversy. After she left in 1915, the Montessori movement in the US fragmented, and Montessori education was a negligible factor in education in the US until 1952.

=== 1915–1939: Further development of Montessori education ===
In 1916, Montessori returned to Europe and took up residence in Barcelona, Spain. Over the next 20 years, Montessori traveled and lectured widely in Europe and gave numerous teacher training courses. Montessori education experienced significant growth in Spain, the Netherlands, the UK, and Italy.

==== Spain (1915–1936) ====
On her return from the US, Montessori continued her work in Barcelona, where a small program sponsored by the Catalan government begun in 1915 had developed into the Escola Montessori, serving children from three to ten years old, and the Laboratori i Seminari de Pedagogia, a research, training, and teaching institute. A fourth international course was given there in 1916, including materials and methods, developed over the previous five years, for teaching grammar, arithmetic, and geometry to elementary school children from six to twelve years of age. In 1917, Montessori published her elementary work in L'autoeducazionne nelle Scuole Elementari (Self-Education in Elementary School), which appeared in English as The Advanced Montessori Method. Around 1920, the Catalan independence movement began to demand that Montessori take a political stand and make a public statement favoring Catalan independence, and she refused. Official support was withdrawn from her programs. In 1924, a new military dictatorship closed Montessori's model school in Barcelona, and Montessori education declined in Spain, although Barcelona remained Montessori's home for the next twelve years. In 1933, under the Second Spanish Republic, a new training course was sponsored by the government, and government support was re-established. In 1934, she published two books in Spain, Psicogeometrica and Psicoarithemetica. With the onset of the Spanish Civil War in 1936, political and social conditions drove Montessori to leave Spain permanently.

==== Netherlands (1917–1936) ====
In 1917, Montessori lectured in Amsterdam, and the Netherlands Montessori Society was founded. She returned in 1920 to give a series of lectures at the University of Amsterdam. Montessori programs flourished in the Netherlands, and by the mid-1930s there were more than 200 Montessori schools in the country. In 1935 the headquarters of the Association Montessori Internationale, or AMI, moved permanently to Amsterdam.

==== United Kingdom (1919–1936) ====
Montessori education was met with enthusiasm and controversy in England between 1912 and 1914. In 1919, Montessori came to England for the first time and gave an international training course which was received with high interest. Montessori education continued to spread in the UK, although the movement experienced some of the struggles over authenticity and fragmentation that took place in the US. Montessori continued to give training courses in England every other year until the beginning of World War II.

==== Italy (1922–1934) ====
In 1922, Montessori was invited to Italy on behalf of the government to give a course of lectures and later to inspect Italian Montessori schools. Later that year, Benito Mussolini's Fascist government came to power in Italy. In December, Montessori returned to Italy to plan a series of annual training courses under government sponsorship, and in 1923 the minister of education Giovanni Gentile expressed his support for Montessori schools and teacher training. In 1924, Montessori met with Mussolini, who extended his official support for Montessori education as part of the national program. A pre-war group of Montessori supporters, the Societa gli Amici del Metodo Montessori (Society of Friends of the Montessori Method) became the Opera Montessori (Montessori Society) with a government charter, and by 1926 Mussolini was made honorary president of the organization. In 1927, Mussolini established a Montessori teacher training college, and by 1929 the Italian government supported a wide range of Montessori institutions. From 1930 on, Montessori and the Italian government came into conflict over financial support and ideological issues, especially after Montessori's lectures on Peace and Education. In 1932, she and her son Mario were placed under political surveillance. In 1933, she resigned from the Opera Montessori, and in 1934 she left Italy. The Italian government ended Montessori activities in the country in 1936. Montessori's antifascist views caused her to be forced into exile from Italy during Mussolini's premiership. During her exile, she developed her work Education for Peace in which she expressed her ideal that children are peacemakers and education is the only true means to eliminate war. She said: "Establishing lasting peace is the work of education; all politics can do is keep us out of war."

==== Other countries ====
Montessori lectured in Vienna in 1923, and her lectures were published as Il Bambino in Famiglia, published in English in 1936 as The Child in the Family. Between 1913 and 1936, Montessori schools and societies were also established in France, Germany, Switzerland, Belgium, Russia, Serbia, Canada, India, China, Japan, Indonesia, Australia, and New Zealand.

==== The Association Montessori Internationale ====
In 1929, the first International Montessori Congress was held in Elsinore, Denmark, in conjunction with the Fifth Conference of the New Education Fellowship. At this event, Montessori and her son Mario founded the Association Montessori Internationale or AMI "to oversee the activities of schools and societies all over the world and to supervise the training of teachers". AMI also controlled rights to the publication of Montessori's works and the production of authorized Montessori didactic materials. Early sponsors of the AMI included Sigmund Freud, Jean Piaget, and Rabindranath Tagore.

==== Peace ====
In 1932, Montessori spoke on Peace and Education at the Second International Montessori Congress in Nice, France. This lecture was published by the Bureau International d'Education, Geneva, Switzerland. In 1932, Montessori spoke at the International Peace Club in Geneva, Switzerland, on the theme of Peace and Education. Montessori held peace conferences from 1932 to 1939 in Geneva, Brussels, Copenhagen, and Utrecht, which were later published in Italian as Educazione e Pace, and in English as Education and Peace. In 1949, and again in 1950 and in 1951, Montessori was nominated for the Nobel Peace Prize, receiving a total of six nominations.

==== Laren, the Netherlands (1936–1939) ====
In 1936, Montessori and her family left Barcelona for England, and soon moved to Laren, near Amsterdam. Here Montessori and her son Mario continued to develop new materials, including the knobless cylinders, the grammar symbols, and botany nomenclature cards. In the context of rising military tensions in Europe, Montessori increasingly turned her attention to the theme of peace. In 1937, the 6th International Montessori Congress was held on the theme of "Education for Peace", and Montessori called for a "science of peace" and spoke about the role of education of the child as a key to the reform of society. In 1938, Montessori was invited to India by the Theosophical Society to give a training course, and in 1939 she left the Netherlands with her son and collaborator Mario.

=== 1939–1946: Montessori in India ===
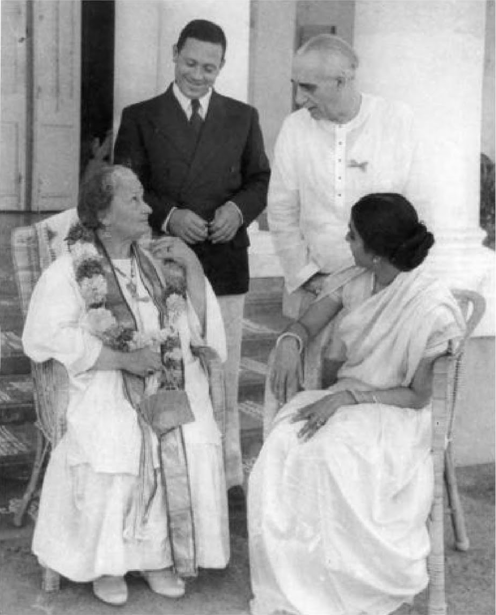
Montessori with her son Mario (on the left) and the theosophist George Arundale with his wife Rukmini Devi (on the right) in India, c. 1939

An interest in Montessori had existed in India since 1913 when an Indian student attended the first international course in Rome, and students throughout the 1920s and 1930s had come back to India to start schools and promote Montessori education. The Montessori Society of India was formed in 1926, and Il Metodo was translated into Gujarati and Hindi in 1927. By 1929, Indian poet Rabindranath Tagore had founded many "Tagore-Montessori" schools in India, and Indian interest in Montessori education was strongly represented at the International Congress in 1929. Montessori herself had been personally associated with the Theosophical Society since 1899 when she became a member of the European Section of the Society, although her membership would eventually lapse. The Theosophical movement, motivated to educate India's poor, was drawn to Montessori education as one solution.

==== Internment in India ====
Montessori gave a training course at the Theosophical Society in Madras in 1939, and had intended to give a tour of lectures at various universities, and then return to Europe. When Italy entered World War Two on the side of Germany in 1940, Britain interned all Italians in the UK and its colonies as enemy aliens. In fact, only Mario Montessori was interned, while Montessori herself was confined to the Theosophical Society compound, and Mario was reunited with his mother after two months. The Montessoris remained in Madras and Kodaikanal until 1946, although they were allowed to travel in connection with lectures and courses.

==== Elementary material, cosmic education, and lessons on early childhood ====
During her years in India, Montessori and her son Mario continued to develop her educational method. The term "cosmic education" was introduced to describe an approach for children aged from six to twelve years that emphasized the interdependence of all the elements of the natural world. Children worked directly with plants and animals in their natural environments, and the Montessoris developed lessons, illustrations, charts, and models for use with elementary aged children. Material for botany, zoology, and geography was created. Between 1942 and 1944 these elements were incorporated into an advanced course for work with children from six to twelve years old. This work led to two books: Education for a New World and To Educate the Human Potential.

While in India, Montessori observed children and adolescents of all ages and turned to the study of infancy. In 1944, she gave a series of 30 lectures on the first three years of life, and a government-recognized training course in Sri Lanka. These lectures were collected in 1949 in the book What You Should Know About Your Child. In 1944, the Montessoris were granted some freedom of movement and traveled to Sri Lanka. In 1945, Montessori attended the first All India Montessori Conference in Jaipur, and in 1946, with the war over, she and her family returned to Europe.

=== 1946–1952: Final years ===
In 1946, at the age of 76, Montessori returned to Amsterdam, and she spent the next six years travelling in Europe and India. She gave a training course in London in 1946, and in 1947 opened a training institute there, the Montessori Centre. After a few years this centre became independent of Montessori and continued as the St. Nicholas Training Centre. Also in 1947, she returned to Italy to re-establish the Opera Nazionale Montessori and gave two more training courses. Later that year she returned to India and gave courses in Adyar and Ahmedabad. These courses led to the first English edition of the book The Absorbent Mind, which was based on notes taken by students during the courses. During these courses, Montessori described the development of the child from birth onwards and presented her concept of the Four Planes of Development. In 1948 Il Metodo della Pedagogia Scientifica applicato all'educazione infantile nelle Case dei Bambini was revised again and published in English as The Discovery of the Child. In 1949, she gave a course in Karachi, Pakistan and the Pakistan Montessori Association was founded.

In 1949, Montessori returned to Europe and attended the 8th International Montessori Congress in Sanremo, Italy, where a model classroom was demonstrated. The same year, the first training course for birth to three years of age, called the Scuola Assistenti all'infanzia (Montessori School for Assistants to Infancy) was established. She was nominated for the Nobel Peace Prize. Montessori was also awarded the French Legion of Honor, Officer of the Dutch Order of Orange Nassau, and received an Honorary Doctorate from the University of Amsterdam. In 1950, she visited Scandinavia, represented Italy at the UNESCO conference in Florence, presented at the 29th international training course in Perugia, gave a national course in Rome, published a fifth edition of Il Metodo with the new title La Scoperta del Bambino (The Discovery of the Child), and was again nominated for the Nobel Peace Prize. In 1951, she participated in the 9th International Montessori Congress in London, gave a training course in Innsbruck, was nominated for the third time for the Nobel Peace Prize.

Montessori was directly involved in the development and founding of the UNESCO Institute for Education in 1951. She was present at the first preliminary meeting of the UNESCO Governing Board in Wiesbaden, Germany on 19 June 1951 and delivered a speech. She used the address as an opportunity to redouble her advocacy for the rights of the child, whom she often referred to as the "forgotten citizen", or "neglected citizen", by declaring:

Remember that people do not start at the age of twenty, at ten or at six, but at birth. In your efforts at solving problems, do not forget that children and young people make up a vast population, a population without rights which is being crucified on school-benches everywhere, which – for all that we talk about democracy, freedom and human rights – is enslaved by a school order, by intellectual rules, which we impose on it. We define the rules which are to be learnt, how they should be learnt and at what age. The child population is the only population without rights. The child is the neglected citizen. Think of this and fear the revenge of this populace. For it is his soul that we are suffocating. It is the lively powers of the mind that we are oppressing, powers which cannot be destroyed without killing the individual, powers which tend either towards violence or destruction, or slip away into the realm of sickness, as Dr. Stern has so well elucidated.

10 December 1951 was the third anniversary of the Universal Declaration of Human Rights and in observance of this UNESCO held a celebration. Montessori was one of the invited guests who would also deliver a speech to commemorate and memorialize the momentous occasion. As with her speech six months previously – in front of the UNESCO Board of Governors in Wiesbaden – Montessori once again highlighted the lack of any "Declaration of the Rights of the Child" stating in part, "in truth, the [Universal] Declaration of Human Rights appears to be exclusively dedicated to adult society."

=== Death ===
Montessori died of a cerebral hemorrhage on 6 May 1952 at the age of 81 in Noordwijk aan Zee, the Netherlands.

== Educational philosophy and pedagogy ==
=== Early influences ===
Montessori's theory and philosophy of education were initially heavily influenced by the work of Jean Marc Gaspard Itard, Édouard Séguin, Friedrich Fröbel, and Johann Heinrich Pestalozzi, all of whom emphasized sensory exploration and manipulatives. Montessori's first work with children with learning difficulties, at the Orthophrenic School in 1900–1901, used the methods of Itard and Séguin, training children in physical activities such as walking and the use of a spoon, training their senses by exposure to sights, smells, and tactile experiences, and introducing letters in tactile form. These activities developed into the Montessori "Sensorial" materials.

=== Scientific pedagogy ===
Montessori considered her work in the Orthophrenic School and her subsequent psychological studies and research work in elementary schools as "scientific pedagogy", a concept current in the study of education at the time. She called for not just observation and measurement of students, but for the development of new methods which would transform them. "Scientific education, therefore, was that which, while based on science, modified and improved the individual." Further, education itself should be transformed by science: "The new methods if they were run on scientific lines, ought to change completely both the school and its methods, ought to give rise to a new form of education."

=== Casa dei Bambini ===
Working with non-disabled children in the Casa dei Bambini in 1907, Montessori began to develop her own pedagogy. The essential elements of her educational theory emerged from this work, described in The Montessori Method in 1912 and in The Discovery of the Child in 1948. Her method was founded on the observation of children at liberty to act freely in an environment prepared to meet their needs. Montessori came to the conclusion that the children's spontaneous activity in this environment revealed an internal program of development, and that the appropriate role of the educator was to remove obstacles to this natural development and provide opportunities for it to proceed and flourish.

Accordingly, the schoolroom was equipped with child-sized furnishings, "practical life" activities such as sweeping and washing tables, and teaching material that Montessori had developed herself. Children were given the freedom to choose and carry out their own activities, at their own pace and following their own inclinations. In these conditions, Montessori made a number of observations which became the foundation of her work. First, she observed great concentration in the children and spontaneous repetition of chosen activities. She also observed a strong tendency in the children to order their own environment, straightening tables and shelves, and ordering materials. As children chose some activities over others, Montessori refined the materials she offered to them. Over time, the children began to exhibit what she called "spontaneous discipline".

=== Further development and Montessori education today ===
Montessori continued to develop her pedagogy and her model of human development as she expanded her work and extended it to older children. She saw human behavior as guided by universal, innate characteristics in human psychology which her son and collaborator Mario M. Montessori Sr. identified as "human tendencies" in 1957. In addition, she observed four distinct periods, or "planes", in human development, extending from birth to six years, from six to twelve, from twelve to eighteen, and from eighteen to twenty-four. She saw different characteristics, learning modes, and developmental imperatives active in each of these planes, and called for educational approaches specific to each period. Over the course of her lifetime, Montessori developed pedagogical methods and materials for the first two planes, from birth to age twelve, and wrote and lectured about the third and fourth planes. She created over 4,000 Montessori classrooms across the world and her books were translated into many different languages for the training of new educators. Her methods are installed in hundreds of public and private schools across the United States.

== Montessori method ==
One of Montessori's many accomplishments was the Montessori method. This is a method of education for young children that stresses the development of a child's own initiative and natural abilities, especially through practical play. This method allowed children to develop at their own pace and provided educators with a new understanding of child development. Montessori's book, The Montessori Method, presents the method in detail. Educators who followed this model set up special environments to meet the needs of students in three developmentally-meaningful age groups: 2–2.5 years, 2.5–6 years, and 6–12 years. The students learn through activities that involve exploration, manipulations, order, repetition, abstraction, and communication. Teachers encourage children in the first two age groups to use their senses to explore and manipulate materials in their immediate environment. Children in the last age group deal with abstract concepts based on their newly developed powers of reasoning, imagination, and creativity.

== Legacy ==
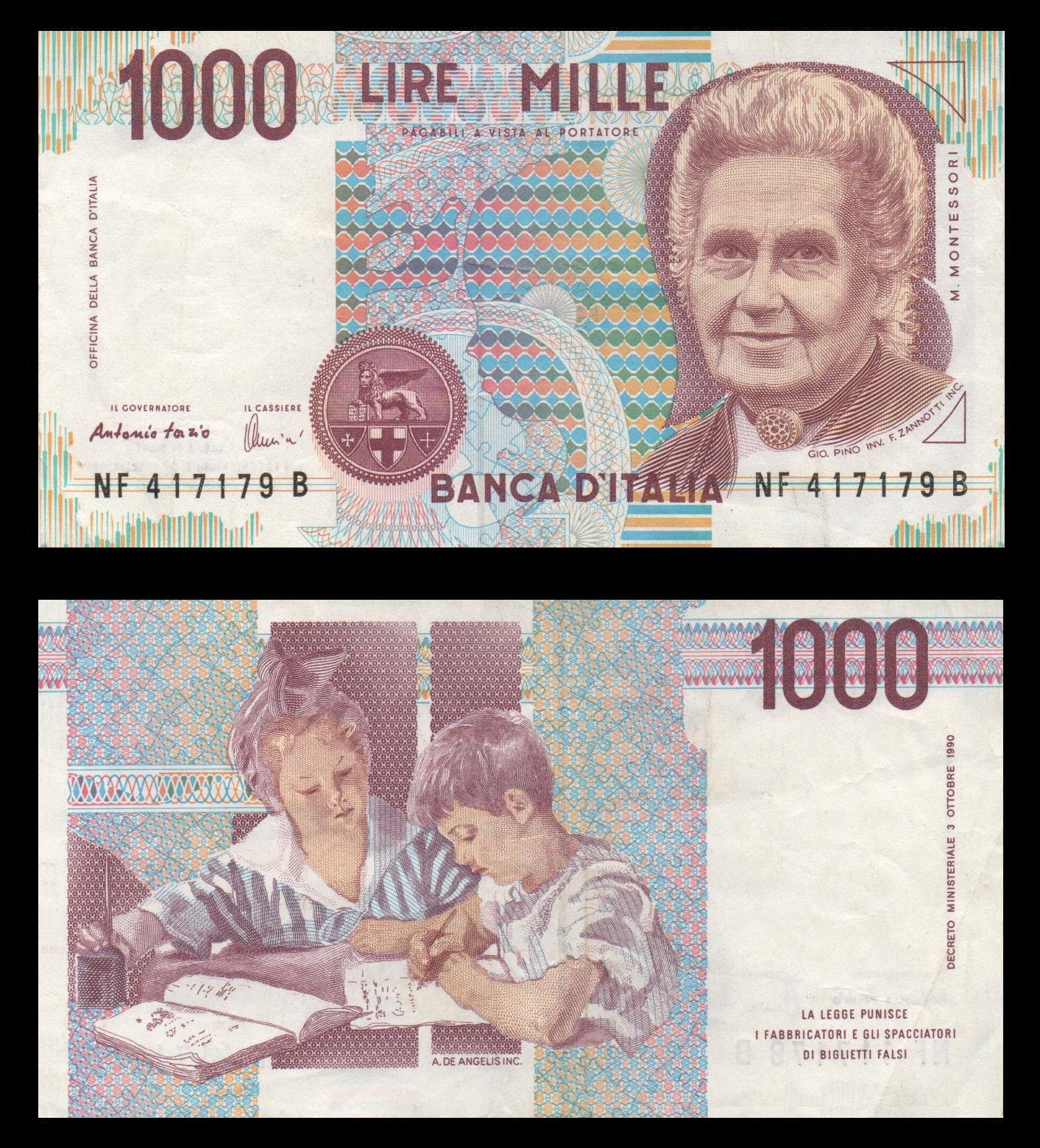
Italian lira banknote, 1990 issue

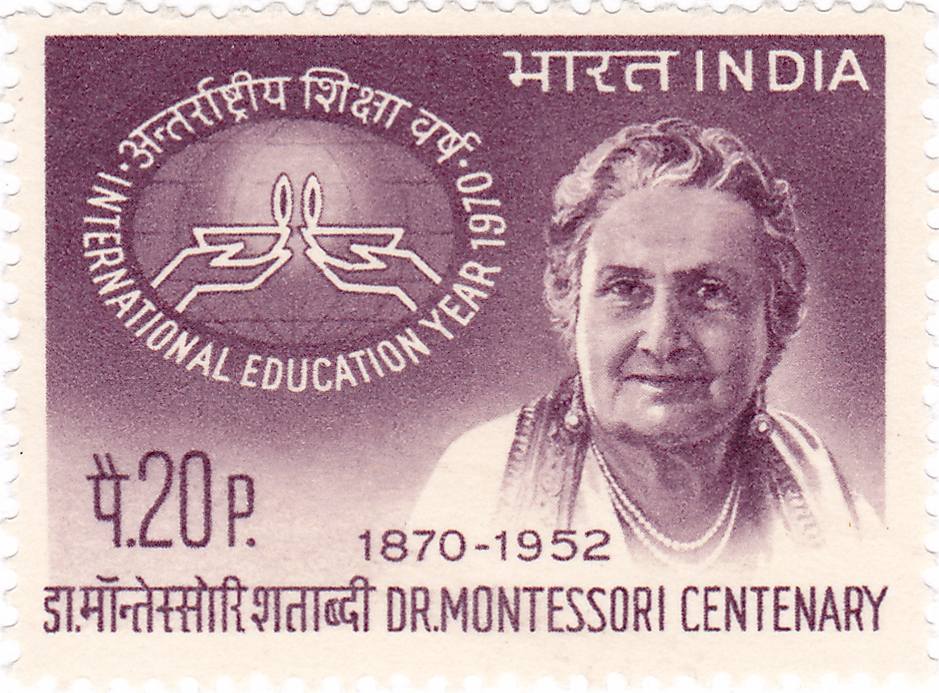
Montessori on a 1970 stamp of India

A range of practices exist under the name Montessori, which is not trademarked. Popular elements include mixed-age classrooms, student freedom (including their choices of activity), long blocks of uninterrupted work time, specially trained teachers, and prepared environment. Research on the Montessori method has generally reported positive outcomes. A 2017 review concluded that broad evidence existed for its efficacy, while noting that many studies were methodologically limited. Two meta-analyses published in 2023 reached similar conclusions. A systematic review in Campbell Systematic Reviews screened over 2,000 studies and retained 32 meeting criteria for baseline equivalence and control-group design, finding positive effects across academic and non-academic outcomes. A separate meta-analysis of 33 studies from North America, Asia and Europe found moderate to high effects on cognitive development, social skills, creativity, motor skills and academic achievement. She and Montessori schools were featured on coins and banknotes of Italy, and on stamps of the Netherlands, India, Italy, the Maldives, Pakistan, and Sri Lanka. A KLM (Royal Dutch Airlines) McDonnell Douglas MD-11 (registration PH-KCB) was named after her, and retired in November 2014. In 2019 Time created 89 new covers to celebrate women of the year starting from 1920; it chose Montessori for 1931.

== Works ==
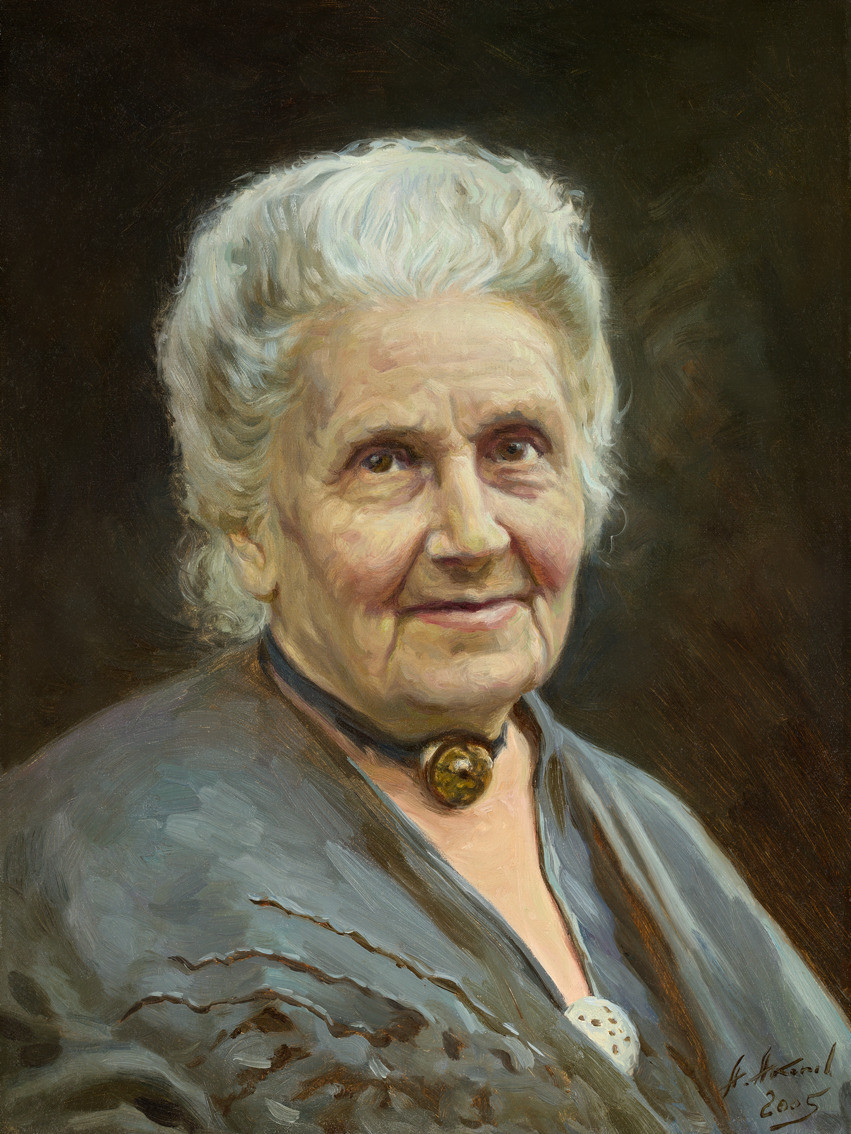
Montessori in a portrait by Alexander Akopov

Montessori published a number of books, articles, and pamphlets during her lifetime, often in Italian but sometimes first in English. According to Kramer, "the major works published before 1920 (The Montessori Method, Pedagogical Anthropology, The Advanced Montessori Method—Spontaneous Activity in Education and The Montessori Elementary Material), were written in Italian by her and translated under her supervision." Many of her later works were transcribed from her lectures, often in translation, and only later published in book form. Most of her works and other compilations of lectures or articles written by Montessori are available through the Montessori-Pierson Publishing Company. Montessori's major works in book form are listed in order of their first publication, with significant revisions and English translations.

- Il Metodo della Pedagogia Scientifica applicato all'educazione infantile nelle Case dei Bambini (Tipografia della Casa Editrice S. Lapi, 1909). Subsequently revised and reissued in 1913 and 1918 (published by Ermanno Loescher), and 1935 (published by Maglione and Strine).
  - English (American) edition: The Montessori Method: Scientific Pedagogy as Applied to Child Education in the Children's Houses [translated by Anne E. George] (Frederick A. Stokes, 1912)
  - English (United Kingdom) edition: The Montessori Method: Scientific Pedagogy as Applied to Child Education in the Children's Houses [translated by Anne E. George] (William Heinemann, 1912)
  - Revised and enlarged English (India) edition The Discovery of the Child [translated by Mary A. Johnstone] (Kalakshetra Publications, 1948)
  - Revised and reissued in Italian as La scoperta del bambino (Garzanti, 1950). A 'new' edition of this title was published by Garzanti in 1970.
    - First American edition of The Discovery of the Child [translated by M. Joseph Costelloe] (Ballantine Books, 1967). Simultaneously versions of this title were published in the United States by Fides Publishers (Notre Dame, Indiana) and Amereon House (New York).
    - English (United Kingdom) edition: The Discovery of the Child [translated by M. Joseph Costelloe] (Clio Press, 1988)
- Antropologia Pedagogica (Vallardi, 1910)
  - English (United Kingdom) edition: Pedagogical Anthropology [translated by Frederick Taber Cooper] (William Heinemann, 1913)
  - English (American) edition: Pedagogical Anthropology [translated by Frederic Taber Cooper] (Frederick A. Stokes, 1913)
- Dr. Montessori's Own Handbook (First published in English; Frederick A. Stokes, 1914)
- L'autoeducazione nelle scuole elementari (Loescher, 1916)
  - English edition published in two volumes (Frederick A. Stokes, 1917):
    - The Advanced Montessori Method, Vol. I: Spontaneous Activity in Education [translated by Florence Simmonds]
    - The Advanced Montessori Method, Vol. II: The Montessori Elementary Material [translated by Arthur Livingston]
- I bambini viventi nella Chiesa (1922)
  - English edition: The Child in the Church: Essays on the Religious Education of Children and the Training of Character [edited by Edwin M. Standing] (1929)
- Das Kind in der Familie (First published in German; 1923)
  - English edition: The Child in the Family [translated by Nancy Cirillo] (1929)
- Psico Geométria (First published in Spanish; 1934)
  - English edition: Psychogeometry [edited by Kay M. Baker and Benedetto Scoppola] (2011)
- Psico Aritmética (First published in Spanish; 1934)
  - English edition: Psychoarithmetic [edited by Kay M. Baker and Benedetto Scoppola] (2016)
- L'Enfant (First published in French; Gonthier, 1936)
  - English edition: The Secret of Childhood (Longmans, Green and Co., 1936)
- De l'enfant à l'adolescent [translated by Georgette J. J. Bernard] (First published in French; Desclée de Brouwer, 1923)
  - English edition: From Childhood to Adolescence (translated by The Montessori Education Research Center] (Schocken Books, 1973)
- Educazione e pace (Garzanti, 1949)
  - English edition: Peace and Education (Theosophical Publishing House, 1949)
- Formazione dell'uomo (Garzanti, 1949)
  - English edition: The Formation of Man [translated by Albert M. Joosten] (Theosophical Publishing House, 1955)
- The Absorbent Mind (Theosophical Publishing House, 1949)
  - Revised and rewritten Italian edition: La mente del bambino. Mente assorbente (Garzanti, 1952)
    - English edition of Italian version: The Absorbent Mind [translated by Claude A. Claremont] (Holt, Rinehart and Winston, 1967)
- Education for a New World (1947)
- To Educate the Human Potential (1947)
