= Victor of Aveyron =

Feral child found in 18th-century France

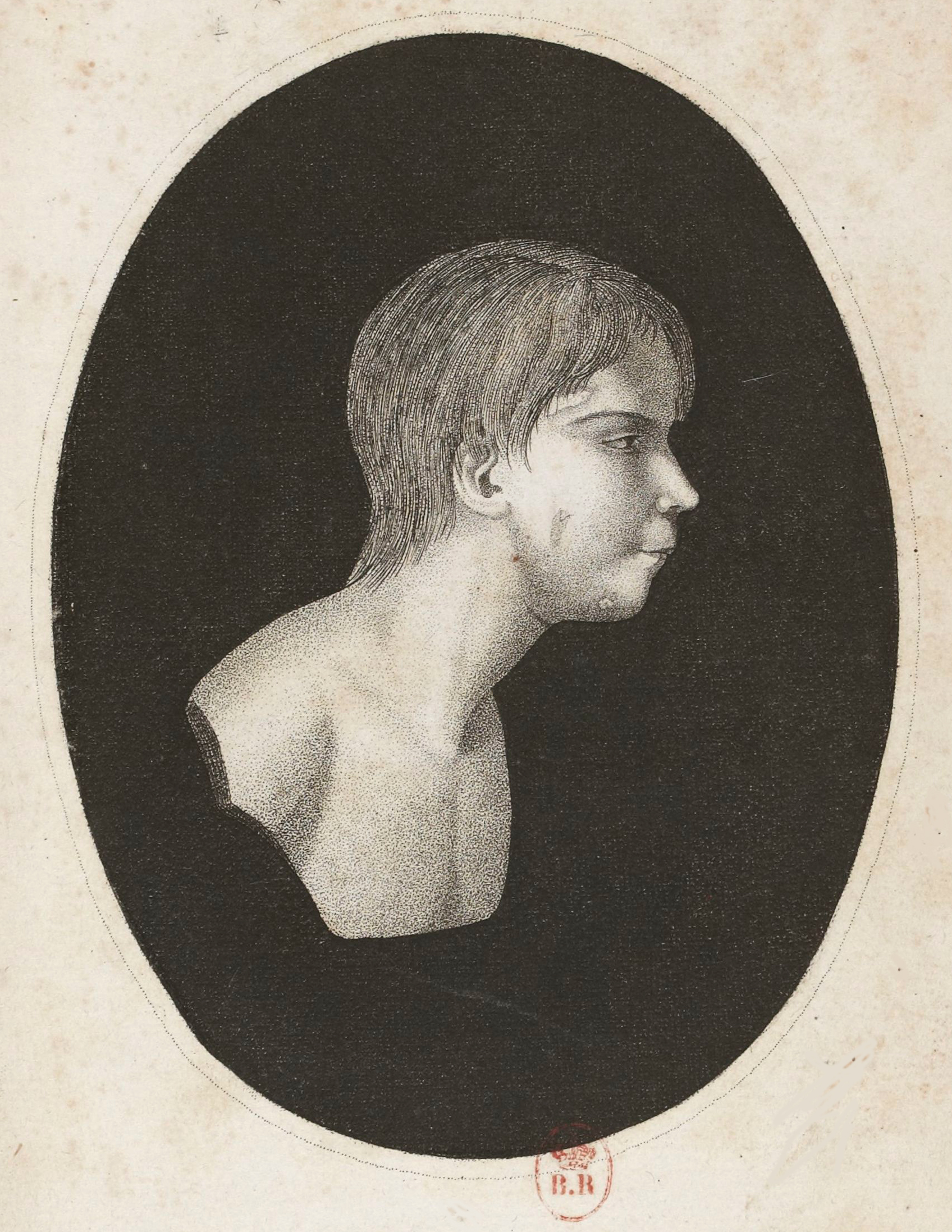
- Victor's portrait from the front cover of the book about him
- Born: c. 1788; Aveyron, Rouergue, France
- Died: 1828 (aged around 40); Paris, France
- Other name: The Wild Boy of Aveyron
- Known for: being a feral child

Victor of Aveyron (French: Victor de l'Aveyron; c. 1788 – 1828) was a French feral child who was found around the age of 9. Not only is he one of the most famous feral children, but his case is also the most documented case of a feral child. Upon his discovery, he was captured multiple times, running away from civilization approximately eight times. Eventually, his case was taken up by a physician, Jean Marc Gaspard Itard, who worked with the boy for five years and gave him his name Victor. Itard was interested in determining what Victor could learn. He devised procedures to teach the boy words and recorded his progress. Based on his work with Victor, Itard broke new ground in the education of the developmentally delayed.

== Early life ==
Victor was prepubescent when he was captured in 1800 but experienced puberty within a year or two. It is not known when or how he came to live in the woods near Saint-Sernin-sur-Rance, though he was reportedly seen there around 1795, in a state that suggested he had already spent more than two years in the wild. In 1797, he was spotted by three hunters; he ran from them, but they were able to catch him when he tried to climb a tree. They brought him to a nearby town where he was cared for by a widow. However, he soon escaped and returned to the woods; he was periodically spotted in 1798 and 1799.

On 8 January 1800, he emerged from the forests on his own. His age was unknown, but citizens of the village estimated his age to be about 12. His lack of speech, as well as his food preferences and the numerous scars on his body, suggested to some that he had been in the wild for most of his life.

He was recorded to have 23 scars: 18 on his body, four on his face, and one on his neck that indicated somebody had attempted to slit his throat many years ago.

== Discovery ==
In 1797, a child of around nine or ten years of age was sighted in Tarn. Two years later, he was caught by some men and dogs, escorted to the village of Lacaune, and taken in by a widow. He ate nothing except for raw vegetables or vegetables he cooked himself. He ran away after a week.

In the winter of 1799, he went from Tarn to Aveyron. On the 6th or 8th of January 1800, he was spotted naked, stooped and with tousled hair by three shoemakers, who took him out of the woods. He ran away, left the woods and was discovered a week later at a dyer's house in Saint-Sernin-sur-Rance. He did not speak and his movements were chaotic. According to the philosopher François Dagognet, "he walks on four legs, eats plants, is hairy, deaf and mute." He was sent to an orphanage at Saint-Affrique three days later, then to another at Rodez on 4 February. The psychiatrist Philippe Pinel, doctor at the Bicêtre Hospital, wrote a report on Victor and considered him to be mentally ill and an idiot from birth (in that era, the term idiot was used to describe individuals with intellectual disabilities).

== Study ==
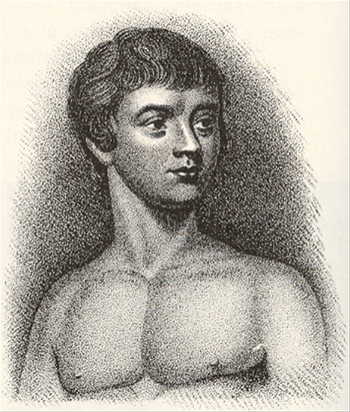
Victor of Aveyron

Shortly after Victor was found, a local abbot and biology professor, Pierre Joseph Bonnaterre, examined him. He removed the boy's clothing and led him outside into the snow, where, far from being upset, Victor began to frolic about in the nude, showing Bonnaterre that he was clearly accustomed to exposure and cold. The local government commissioner, Constans-Saint-Esteve, also observed the boy and wrote there was "something extraordinary in his behavior, which makes him seem close to the state of wild animals".

The boy was eventually taken to Rodez, where two men, who had each lost their sons during the French Revolution, travelled to find out whether he was their missing son. However, neither claimed the boy. There were other rumours regarding Victor's origins. For example, one rumour insisted that the boy was the illegitimate son of a notaire abandoned at a young age because he was mute. Itard believed Victor had "lived in an absolute solitude from his fourth or fifth almost to his twelfth year, which is the age he may have been when he was taken in the Caune woods." That means he presumably lived for seven years in the wilderness.

It was clear that Victor could hear, but he was taken to the National Institute of the Deaf in Paris for the purpose of being studied by Roch-Ambroise Cucurron Sicard. Sicard and other members of the Society of Observers of Man believed that by studying, as well as educating the boy, they would gain the proof they needed for the recently popularized empiricist theory of knowledge. In the context of the Enlightenment, when many were debating what exactly distinguished human from animal, one of the most significant factors was the ability to learn language. By studying the boy, they would also be able to explain the relationship between humans and society.

=== Influence of the Enlightenment ===
The Enlightenment caused many thinkers, including naturalists and philosophers, to believe human nature was a subject that needed to be redefined and looked at from a completely different angle. Because of the French Revolution and new developments in science and philosophy, humans were looked at not as special but as characteristic of their place in nature. It was hoped that by studying the wild boy, this idea would gain support. As such, Victor became a case study in the Enlightenment debate about the differences between humans and other animals.

At that time, the scientific category Juvenis averionensis was used, as a special case of the Homo ferus, described by Carl Linnaeus in Systema Naturae. Linnaeus and his discoveries, then, forced people to ask the question, "What makes us [human]?" Another developing idea prevalent during the Enlightenment was that of the noble savage. Some believed a person existing in the pure state of nature would be "gentle, innocent, a lover of solitude, ignorant of evil and incapable of causing intentional harm."

Philosophies proposed by Rousseau, Locke, and Descartes were evolving around the time the boy was discovered in France in 1800. These philosophies invariably influenced the way the boy was perceived by others, and eventually, how Itard would structure his education.

== Education and later life ==
It was said that even though he had been exposed to society and education, Victor had made little progress at the institution under Sicard. Many people questioned his ability to learn because of his initial state, and as Yousef explains, "it is one thing to say that the man of nature is not yet fully human; it is quite another thing to say that the man of nature cannot become fully human." After Sicard became frustrated with the lack of progress made by the boy, he was left to roam the institution by himself, until Itard decided to take the boy into his home to keep reports and monitor his development.

=== Jean Marc Gaspard Itard ===
Jean Marc Gaspard Itard, a young medical student, effectively adopted Victor into his home and published reports on his progress. Itard believed two things separated humans from animals: empathy and language. He wanted to civilize Victor with the objectives of teaching him to speak and to communicate human emotion. Victor showed significant early progress in understanding language and reading simple words, but failed to progress beyond a rudimentary level. Itard wrote, "Under these circumstances his ear was not an organ for the appreciation of sounds, their articulations and their combinations; it was nothing but a simple means of self-preservation which warned of the approach of a dangerous animal or the fall of wild fruit." Itard gave the boy his name, picking Victor due to its emphasis on the "o" sound, to which Victor was highly responsive.

The only two phrases Victor ever actually learned to spell out were lait ('milk') and Oh, Dieu ('Oh, God'), the latter of which he would often exclaim in moments of joy. He could also vocalise la ('the'). It would seem, however, that Itard implemented more contemporary views when he was educating Victor. Rousseau appears to have believed "that natural association is based on reciprocally free and equal respect between people." This notion of how to educate and to teach was something that, although it did not produce the effects hoped for, did prove to be a step towards new systems of pedagogy. By attempting to learn about the boy who lived in nature, education could be restructured and characterized.

Itard has been recognized as the founder of "oral education of the deaf, the field of otolaryngology, the use of behavior modification with severely impaired children, and special education for the mentally and physically handicapped."

While Victor did not learn to speak the language that Itard tried to teach him, it seems that Victor did make progress in his behavior towards other people. At the Itard home, housekeeper Madame Guérin was setting the table one evening while crying over the loss of her husband. Victor stopped what he was doing and displayed consoling behavior towards her. Itard reported on this progress.

=== Language ===
When looking at the association between language and intellect, French society considered one with the other. Unless cared for by friends or family, the mute routinely ended up in horrible, ghastly conditions. However, around 1750, a French priest, Charles-Michel de l'Épée, created the Institut National de Jeunes Sourds de Paris to educate the deaf and mute. His institution was made into a National Institute in 1790. This new interest and moral obligation towards the deaf and mute inspired Itard to nurture and attempt to teach Victor language. "He had Locke's and Condillac's theory that we are born with empty heads and that our ideas arise from what we perceive and experience. Having experienced almost nothing of society, the boy remained a savage."

Throughout the years Itard spent working with Victor, he made some gradual progress. Victor understood the meaning of actions and used what 20th-century writer Roger Shattuck describes as "action language," which Itard regarded as a kind of primitive form of communication. However, Itard still could not get Victor to speak. He wondered why Victor would choose to remain silent when he had already proved that he was not, in fact, deaf. Victor also did not understand tones of voice. Itard proclaimed "Victor was the mental and psychological equivalent of someone born deaf and dumb. There would be little point in trying to teach him to speak by the normal means of repeating sounds if he didn't really hear them."

Shattuck critiques Itard's process of education, wondering why he never attempted to teach Victor to use sign language. Regardless, today there are certain hypotheses that Shattuck applies to Victor. "One is that the Wild Boy, though born normal, developed a serious mental or psychological disturbance before his abandonment. Precocious schizophrenia, infantile psychosis, autism; a number of technical terms have been applied to his position. Several psychiatrists I have consulted favour this approach. It provides both a motivation for abandonment and an explanation for his partial recovery under Itard's treatment."

Victor died of pneumonia in Paris in 1828 in the home of Madame Guérin.

== Recent commentary and autism theory ==
Professor Uta Frith has stated she believes Victor displayed signs of autism. Serge Aroles, in his book L'énigme des enfants-loups (The Mystery of the Wolf-Children), also believes that surviving accounts of his behavior point to "a moderate degree of autism" (autisme moderé) in Victor's case.

Evidence that Victor may have been autistic can also be found in Dr Itard's writings. Despite being mostly mute, the boy was intelligent—it took him just four days to learn to say "milk"—so his lifelong silence went unexplained. Though never being taught sign language, he was still able to adapt to explicit non-verbal communication. He exhibited stimming-adjacent behaviours such as rocking back and forth, wringing his hands, pacing, thrashing, pressing his fists to his eyes, and tucking his hands into the pockets of his waistcoat. When angry or overwhelmed, he would often fall to the floor with "violent convulsions" that "left him in a state of complete sensory collapse." He was noticed to have a great fondness of order and routine that would distress him when not carried out to his liking. He also had no reaction to extremes in temperature, to the extent where he could touch boiling water or hot coals with no pain, and roll around naked in the snow without any discomfort. The lattermost likely makes him an early recorded case of congenital insensitivity to pain, which can overlap with autism.

In March 2008, following the disclosure that Misha Defonseca's best-selling book, later turned into film Survivre avec les loups ('Surviving with Wolves'), was a hoax, there was a debate in the French media (newspapers, radio, and television) concerning the numerous uncritically believed false cases of feral children. Although there are numerous books on this subject, almost none of them have been based on archives, with the authors using rather dubious second- or third-hand, printed information. According to French surgeon Serge Aroles, author of a general study of the phenomenon of feral children based on archives, almost all of these cases are fakes. In his judgment, Victor of Aveyron was not a genuine feral child; in Aroles' view, the scars on his body were not the consequences of a wild life in the forests, but rather of physical abuse at the hands of his parents or whoever initially raised him. Humans need to be nurtured at least until the age of 5 or 6; it is inconceivable that any child, including Victor, could survive on his own, in the wild, younger than that. This disability could also explain why he was abused, perhaps treated like an animal, in his earliest years. Bettelheim (1959) makes a case for this being a general pattern in the lives of so-called feral children.

== See also ==
- List of solved missing person cases (pre-1950)
