= Montessori in the United States =

The Montessori method was practiced in the United States early after its invention. While the name is not trademarked and there is no central authority for the method, the American Montessori Society (AMS) was established in 1960.

== History ==
After 1907, Maria Montessori's work spread quickly all around the world, soon reaching the US, where many public figures—including Alexander Graham Bell and his wife Mabel Gardiner Hubbard, Thomas Edison, and Woodrow Wilson—appreciated her work.

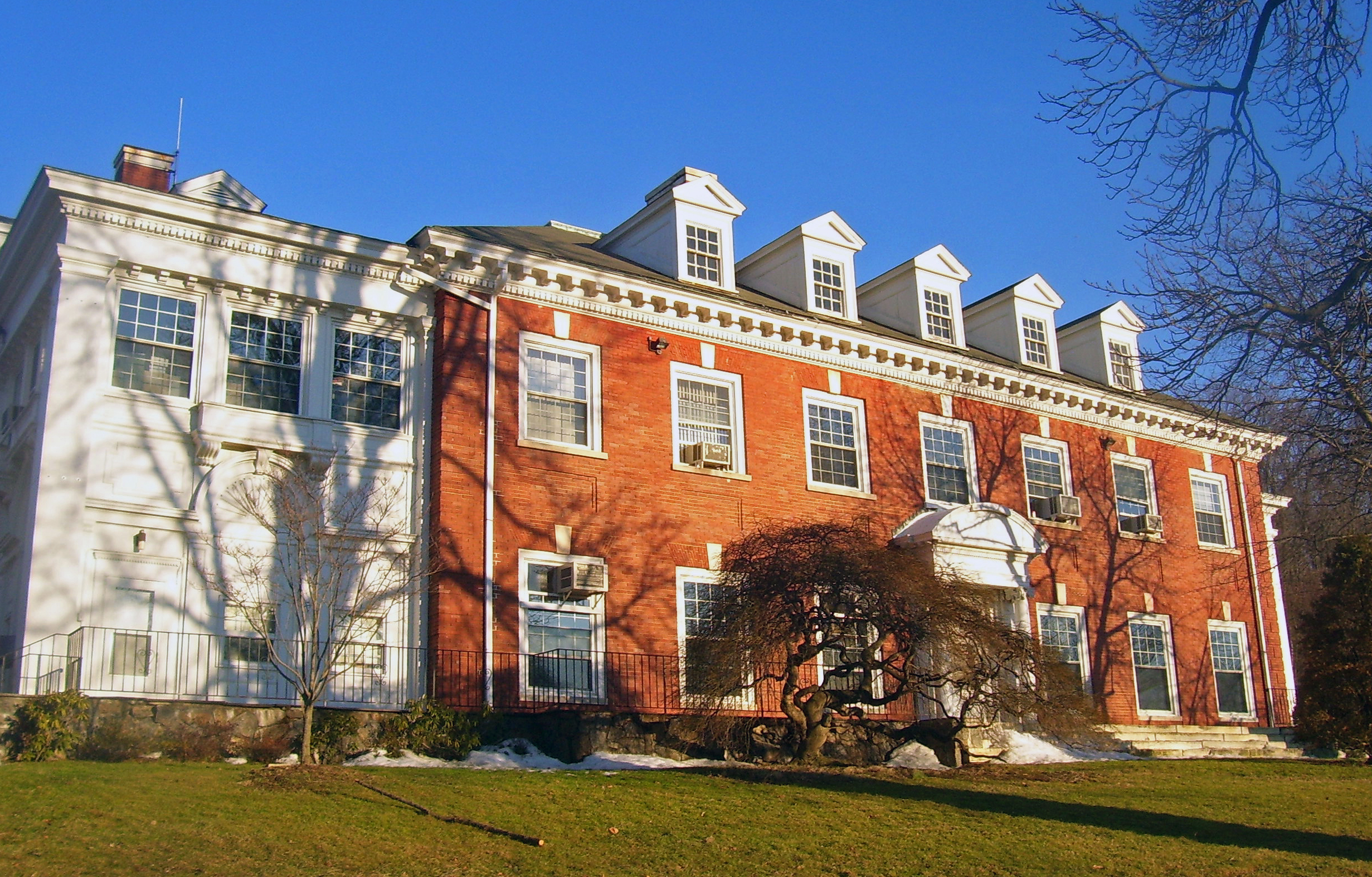
The Edward Harden Mansion in Sleepy Hollow, NY, home to the first U.S. Montessori school in 1911. It is listed on the National Register of Historic Places.

In 1914, Montessori spoke to a standing-room-only audience at Carnegie Hall, in New York City. By 1915, she had been invited to participate in the Panama–Pacific International Exposition in San Francisco, celebrating the opening of the Panama Canal. There, she had set up a fully functioning classroom for display to the attending.

This early American enthusiasm for Montessori was short-lived. William Heard Kilpatrick, an advocate of John Dewey's theories of education, gave a scathing critique in The Montessori System Examined (1914); Montessori schools had virtually disappeared from the US by 1920. The Montessori-method school resurgence did not occur until after 1960, when Nancy McCormick Rambusch and Margaret Stephenson, who each had worked with Montessori in Europe, separately went to the US.

In 1960, Rambusch organized the American Montessori Society (AMS) to Americanize the Montessori method and to make it relevant to the popular culture of the day. In 1958, the Whitby School was founded in Greenwich, Connecticut as the first AMS Montessori school in the US, followed in 1960 by the opening of the Sophia Montessori School opened by Screen actor, director, writer, Tom Laughlin with trained Montessorians Johannes and Joanna Laven, immigrants from Amsterdam. The school was later renamed Santa Monica Montessori School In 1961, Milwaukee Montessori School was established by Hildegard Solzbacher. In 1962 by the Caedmon School in New York City opened. Ernest Wood and Hilda Wood, who had worked with Maria Montessori in India, started the School of the Woods in 1962 as well, in Houston, Texas. The first Montessori school in the Southeast, Springmont, was founded in 1963 in Atlanta. Also in 1963, the Cambridge Montessori School was founded in the basement of St. Bartholomew Church in Cambridge, MA, enrolling 50 students. In 1961, Mario Montessori, head of the Association Montessori Internationale (AMI), sent Stephenson as his personal representative to the United States, and was later given his permission to established a branch office of the AMI in the United States in 1970. The first Episcopal Montessori school in Florida, St. Christopher's By-the-Sea Episcopal Church and Montessori School, was founded in 1968 on Key Biscayne.

In 1967, a trademark dispute arose over the use of the term "Montessori" between AMS and AMI. This conflict was finally settled by the US Patent and Trademark Trial and Appeal Board in its action to refuse to grant exclusive use of the term "Montessori" to any one particular "Montessori" organization, holding that "the term 'Montessori' has a generic and/or descriptive significance."

Disputes over what is a Montessori school have been a continuing aspect of the history of Montessori education, arising especially around the various competing philosophies and interests involved in representing the Montessori method. Despite these conflicts, there are currently more than 5,000 schools identified in some way with the Montessori method.

== Montessori schools ==
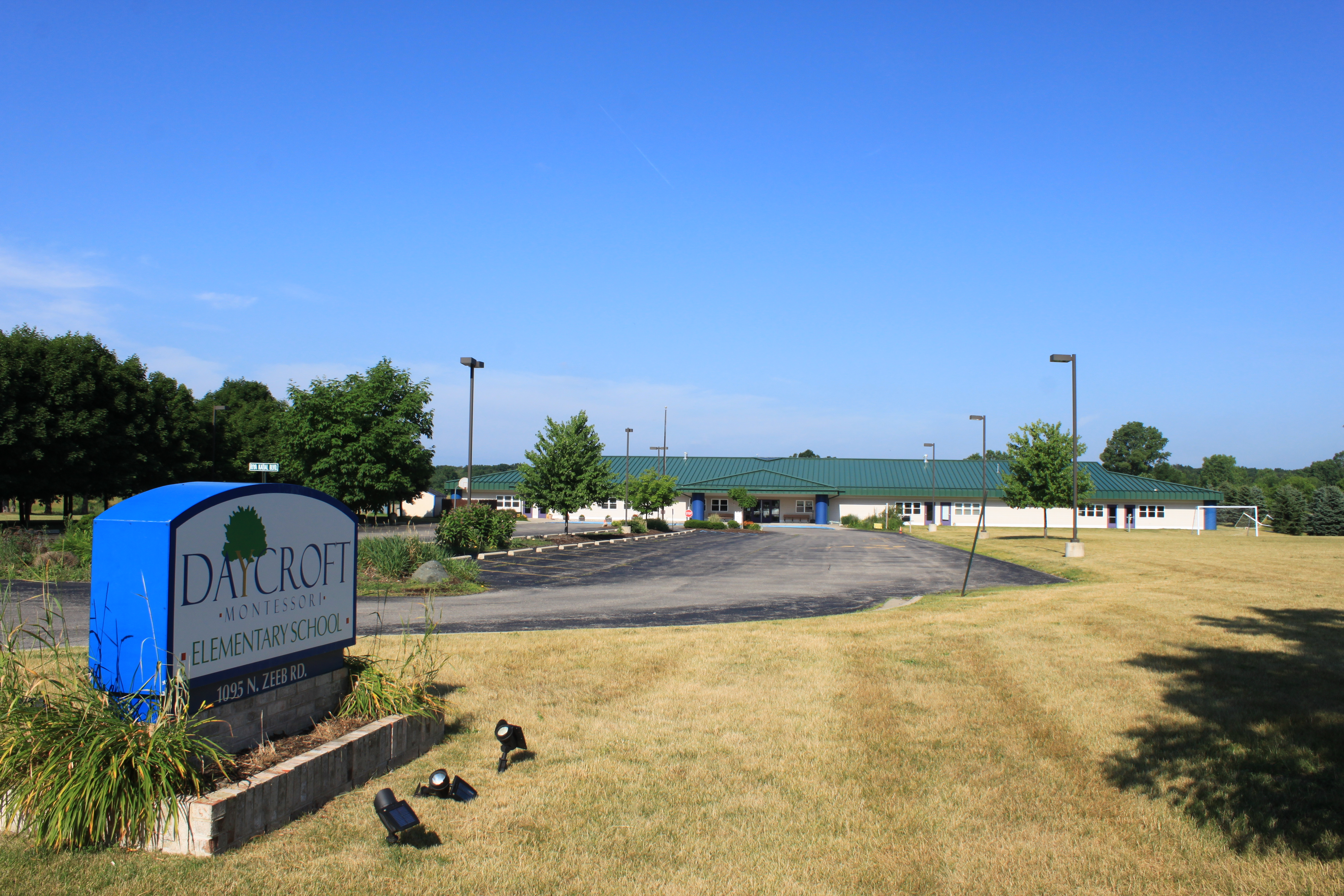
Daycroft Montessori School Scio Township, Michigan

Because there is no single registry or even uniform definition as to what constitutes a Montessori school, there is some dispute as to the number of private Montessori schools in the United States. Estimates range from just under 4,000 to greater than 8,000. There are about 250 public and 120 charter schools that include Montessori programs (see below). Most private schools have a primary program (from 3–6 years) and often a lower elementary (6–9 years). Upper elementary programs (9–12 years) are less common, although about one school in eight will have this program. At this time Montessori junior highs and high schools are rare. However, the first public Montessori high school in the country, Clark Montessori located in Cincinnati, Ohio, was started in 1994. The most recent Montessori high school opened in Philadelphia - Quadrat Academy. Several pilot Montessori junior high schools have opened based on writings by Montessori on Erdkinder, German for "children of the land", which was a term Montessori coined for children ages 12 through 18. The last few years have seen the advent of infant and toddler Montessori programs. Many schools offer "mother and child" programs in which parents can learn about Montessori and how to apply the philosophy to their child-rearing practices. In many other schools, the demand for high-quality childcare has spurred the growth of Montessori infant, or "nido" (the Italian word for "nest") and toddler, or "infant community" programs.

The Montessori community does not have any central authority. AMI (Association Montessori Internationale) is the body that Maria Montessori founded in 1929, and of which she remained founder president until her death in 1952. Her son Mario Montessori was general director of AMI until his death in 1982. AMI endeavours to safeguard the teaching traditions passed down from Maria Montessori to current teachers (otherwise known as a "guide" or "director/directress") through the use of rigorously trained trainers. Although the American Montessori Society (AMS), located in New York City, is by far the largest Montessori organization in the United States, it affiliates only about 25 percent of the schools that call themselves “Montessori.” Many other schools across the country are affiliated with other Montessori organizations or with no organization at all.

Accreditation and quality standards for Montessori teacher education are provided through the Montessori Accreditation Council for Teacher Education (MACTE) located in Charlottesville, Virginia. MACTE is the only national education accreditor recognized by the US Department of Education to accredit Montessori teacher education programs within colleges and universities, free standing institutions and distance education with 120 hours of residency. (MACTE does not accredit on-line programs that don't require a 120-hour residency and a practicum) Non-MACTE accredited programs cannot be considered diploma programs or trade schools, and holders of certifications from those training centers are not eligible to teach in most Montessori schools (other than those accredited by the training centers themselves). For Montessori schools, various organizations provide quality standards through affiliation, recognition, or membership according to their own particular philosophy, procedures and requirements. (see www.macte.org)

== Montessori in the home ==
In the 1960s, a growing homeschool movement arose in the United States, due to parental concern about the quality and nature of the government system of free public schools. By 2003, the number of homeschooling children in the United States rose to over 1 million, an increase of some 29% from 1999. In this growing context, parents have been seeking to use the Montessori Method as well. For example, Elizabeth Hainstock, a homeschooling mother in the United States, used the Montessori method with her own children in the 1960s, and wrote about her experiences and knowledge on the subject in several books to guide other parents interested in using the Montessori method at home. No reliable figure exists of the number of homeschoolers using materials or methods borrowed from Montessori.

== Montessori programs in public schools ==
Public school districts in the U.S. began experimenting with Montessori classrooms in the mid-1970s in Arlington, Virginia; Philadelphia; Reading, Ohio; and San Mateo, California. By the mid-1980s there were about 50 sites. With funding support from federal magnet grants and desegregation efforts, that number surpassed 200 by the beginning of the 21st century.

A survey conducted in 1981 collected data from 25 of the approximately 57 school districts nationwide known to have Montessori programs at the time of this study. Another study of public Montessori programs from 1990 to 1991 received responses from 63 of the 120 school districts or schools to whom surveys were sent. As of July 2013, the Census Project of the National Center for Montessori in the Public Sector reported 443 public Montessori schools in the United States and Puerto Rico.

Results from the 1991 study indicated that the number of students in the schools or school districts averaged 233, with an average of 10 teachers per program. A total of 32, or 58%, of the schools surveyed reported that they were magnet schools. A total of 69% of the Montessori programs shared a building with other programs. District funding for the training of Montessori teachers was provided in 66% of the districts. Only 42% of the programs provided the three-year age span of three-, four-, and five-year-olds. This indicates that the degree to which particular districts implement the Montessori model varies. A total of 16 of the 57 schools charged tuition for some part of the program. About two thirds of the programs provided free transportation. In addition, two thirds of the districts reported that additional staff were used in the Montessori magnet schools. These factors can add to the overall costs of the program.

A survey in 2004 by Heather Bilton for her dissertation found that in public Montessori schools: • About half the students receive free or reduced price lunch • Most principals do not have Montessori training • A bit more than half of the teachers have Montessori credentials • Most have chosen to use materials that are not "Montessori"

In January 2007, The Washington Post published an article titled "Montessori, Now 100, Goes Mainstream". The article discussed the increasing number of Montessori public school programs, particularly in African-American communities.

Once a maverick experiment that appealed only to middle-class white families, Montessori schools have become popular with some black professionals and are getting results in low income public schools with the kind of children on which Montessori first tested her ideas.

The article goes on to discuss how Montessori has been implemented in the public schools, and has become an attractive option to black, middle-class parents because it provides an alternative to the "No Child Left Behind" strategies in most current public school curricula.

== See also ==
- American Montessori Society
- Association Montessori International of the United States
