= Cosley Zoo =

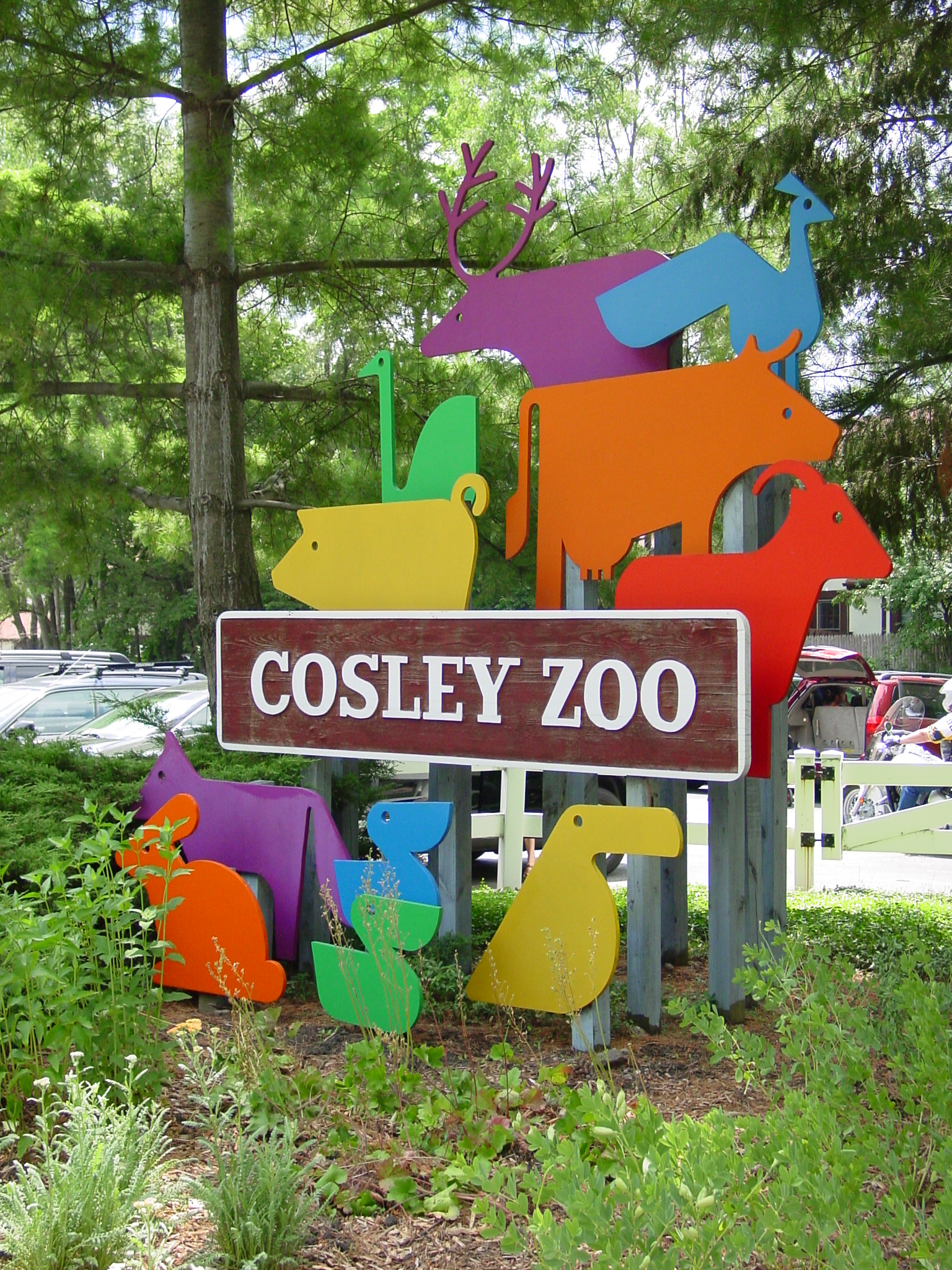
- The main sign
- Interactive map of Cosley Zoo
- 41.8781°N 88.1208°W
- Location: Wheaton, Illinois, US
- Land area: 5 acres (2.0 ha)
- Memberships: AZA
- Website: www.cosleyzoo.org

Cosley Zoo is an AZA-accredited zoo located in Wheaton, Illinois. It is a facility of the Wheaton Park District and open year-round. The zoo, which is situated on 5 acres (2.0 ha) of land, is built on the site of a historic train station and consists of both domestic animals and wildlife that is native to North America.

The zoo holds various youth-directed programs, including a Junior Zookeepers program, birthday parties/facility rentals, and holiday events.

== Blanding's turtle rehabilitation project ==
Cosley Zoo, the DuPage County Forest Preserve, and other local partners collaborate in an effort to increase the population of the endangered Blanding's turtle. Eggs are incubated and hatched at a partner facility, then some arrive at Cosley Zoo where they are reared for about a year before being released into a DuPage County wetland. The zoo has helped rear and release more than 4,000 Blanding's turtles since becoming involved with the head start component of the Blanding's Turtle Recovery Project in 2001.

== Species list ==
=== Amphibians ===
four-toed salamander, Cope's gray tree frog, gray tree frog

=== Birds ===
American kestrel, American robin, Baltimore oriole, barn owl, blue jay, brown-headed cowbird, chicken, domestic duck, gray catbird, great horned owl, Hahn's macaw, killdeer, mallard, northern pintail, red-tailed hawk, redhead, Sandhill crane, screech owl, turkey vulture, wood duck

=== Invertebrates ===
giant African millipede, Honduran curly hair tarantula, Madagascar hissing cockroach

=== Mammals ===
American guinea hog, black angus cattle, Canada lynx, coyote, four-toed hedgehog, Guernsey cattle, domestic rabbit, lesser Madagascar hedgehog tenrec, llama, miniature donkey, miniature horse, Montadale sheep, nine-banded armadillo, North American porcupine, Norwegian Fjord horse, Nubian goat, raccoon, red fox, white-tailed deer

=== Reptiles ===
Blanding's turtle, California kingsnake, central bearded dragon, common bullsnake, corn snake, eastern blue-tongued skink, eastern box turtle, eastern rat snake, midland painted turtle, three-toed box turtle, western dusky hognose snake

== History ==
On November 9, 1973, Paula Jones donated 2.65 acres of land in honor of relative Harvey Cosley. It opened as Cosley Children's Park and Museum in August 1974. In 1975, the zoo acquired a retired caboose that sat next to the former train station. The zoo gained enough funding to expand by 2 acres in 1976. In the same year, the park changed its name to Cosley Animal Farm and Museum. In 1982, the park built an aviary to house 13 varieties of pheasants as well as ruffed grouse, doves, and several other birds. In 1987, the Vern Kiebler Learning Center was completed. In 1999, the zoo staff and the Wheaton Park District decided to give the park its current name, Cosley Zoo. In 2000, the Zoo received accreditation by the Association of Zoos and Aquariums. It started its work with the DuPage County Forest Preserve District to rehabilitate Illinois' Blanding's turtle population in 2001.
