= Wheaton Park District =

Park district in Wheaton, Illinois, US

Coordinates: 41°51′57.4″N 88°6′22.9″W

The Wheaton Park District is an organization dedicated to leisure and recreation in Wheaton, Illinois, US. It was incorporated in 1921 and now contains more than 800 acres of land. In addition to the many full-time employees, the park district also employs nearly 1,000 summer part-time staff, often local high school and college students. The National Recreation and Park Association has awarded the National Gold Medal Award for Excellence to the Wheaton Park District four times.

== Activities ==
The Wheaton Park District also organizes league sports for the citizens of Wheaton, including baseball, softball, basketball, soccer, volleyball, lacrosse, American football and cheerleading. It also offers a variety of camps and programs for children throughout the summer. Year-round, there are programs for children, youth, families and adults at the community center.

== Facilities ==
It oversees the following facilities:

=== Aquatic centers ===
- Northside Family Aquatic Center
- Rice Pool and Water Park

=== Golf ===
- Arrowhead Golf Club
- Clocktower Commons (mini-golf and skate park)

=== Fitness ===
- Community Center
- Memorial Leisure Center
- Parks Plus Fitness Center

=== Recreation/Education ===
- Lincoln Marsh Natural Area
- Safety City
- DuPage County Historical Museum
- Cosley Zoo

=== Parks ===
There are 52 additional parks located in and around Wheaton that are open for community use.
