= Caedmon (disambiguation) =

Cædmon is the earliest English poet whose name is known.

Caedmon or Cædmon may also refer to:

- Caedmon Audio, a record label
- Caedmon College, a secondary school in Whitby, North Yorkshire, England
- Cædmon manuscript, one of the four major codices of Old English literature
- Caedmon School, an independent Montessori elementary school and preschool in New York City, United States
- Caedmon's Call, a contemporary Christian band
- MV Caedmon, a vehicle and passenger ferry
