= Southern Wake Montessori School =

Southern Wake Montessori School was a collaborative, not-for-profit community of children, their families and teachers located in Holly Springs, NC.

Southern Wake Montessori School (SWMS) closed for business July 24, 2009.

== See also ==
- Montessori in the United States
