= Wheaton, Illinois =

- City
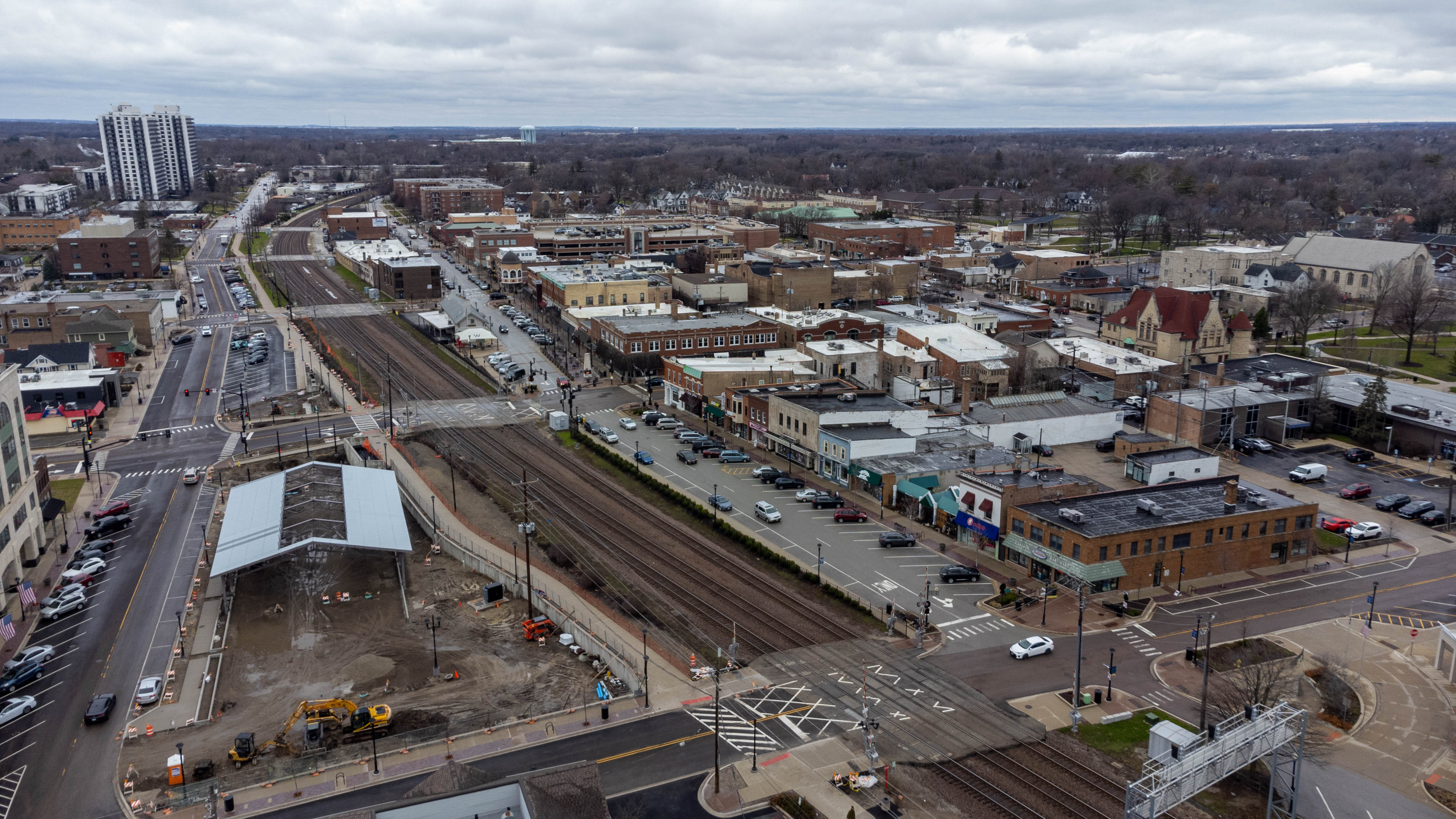
- Downtown Wheaton (2022)

- Flag
- Interactive map of Wheaton, Illinois
- Location within Chicago metropolitan area Location within Illinois Location within the United States
- Coordinates: 41°51′22″N 88°06′30″W
- Country: United States
- State: Illinois
- Counties: DuPage
- Townships: Milton, Winfield
- Founded: 1831
- Incorporated: 1859 (village); 1890 (city)

Government
  - Type: Council–manager
  - Mayor: Phillip Suess
  - City Manager: Michael Dzugan
  - City Code: Link to Code
  - Zoning: Link to Zoning
  - City Calendar: Link to Calendar

Area
  - Total: 11.49 sq mi (29.75 km^{2})
  - Land: 11.32 sq mi (29.31 km^{2})
  - Water: 0.17 sq mi (0.43 km^{2})
- Elevation: 748 ft (228 m)

Population (2020)
  - Total: 53,970
  - Estimate 2024: 53,741 ▼
  - Density: 4,769/sq mi (1,841/km^{2})
- Demonym: Wheatie
- Time zone: UTC−6 (CST)
  - Summer (DST): UTC−5 (CDT)
- ZIP Code: 60187, 60189
- Area code: 630 and 331
- FIPS code: 17-81048
- GNIS ID: 2397294
- Website: www.wheaton.il.us

Wheaton is a city in and the county seat of DuPage County, Illinois, United States. It is located in Milton and Winfield Townships, approximately 25 miles (40 km) west of Chicago. As of the 2020 census, Wheaton's population was 53,970, making it the 27th-most populous municipality in the state.

== History ==
=== Founding ===
The city dates its founding to the period between 1831 and 1837, after the passage of the Indian Removal Act, when Erastus Gary laid claim to 790 acres (320 ha) of land near present-day Warrenville. The Wheaton brothers arrived from Connecticut and in 1837, Warren L. Wheaton laid claim to 640 acres (260 ha) of land in the center of town. Jesse Wheaton later made claim to 300 acres (120 ha) of land just west of Warren's. It was not long before other settlers from New England joined them in the community. In 1848, they gave the Galena and Chicago Union Railroad three miles (4.8 km) of right of way, upon which railroad officials named the depot Wheaton. In 1850, ten blocks of land were platted and anyone who was willing to build immediately was granted free land. In 1853, the lots were surveyed and a formal plat for the community was filed with the county. The community was incorporated as a village on February 24, 1859, with Warren serving as its first president. The village was later incorporated as a city on April 24, 1890, when the first mayor of the city was selected, Judge Elbert Gary, son of Erastus Gary and founder of Gary, Indiana.

=== Establishment as county seat ===
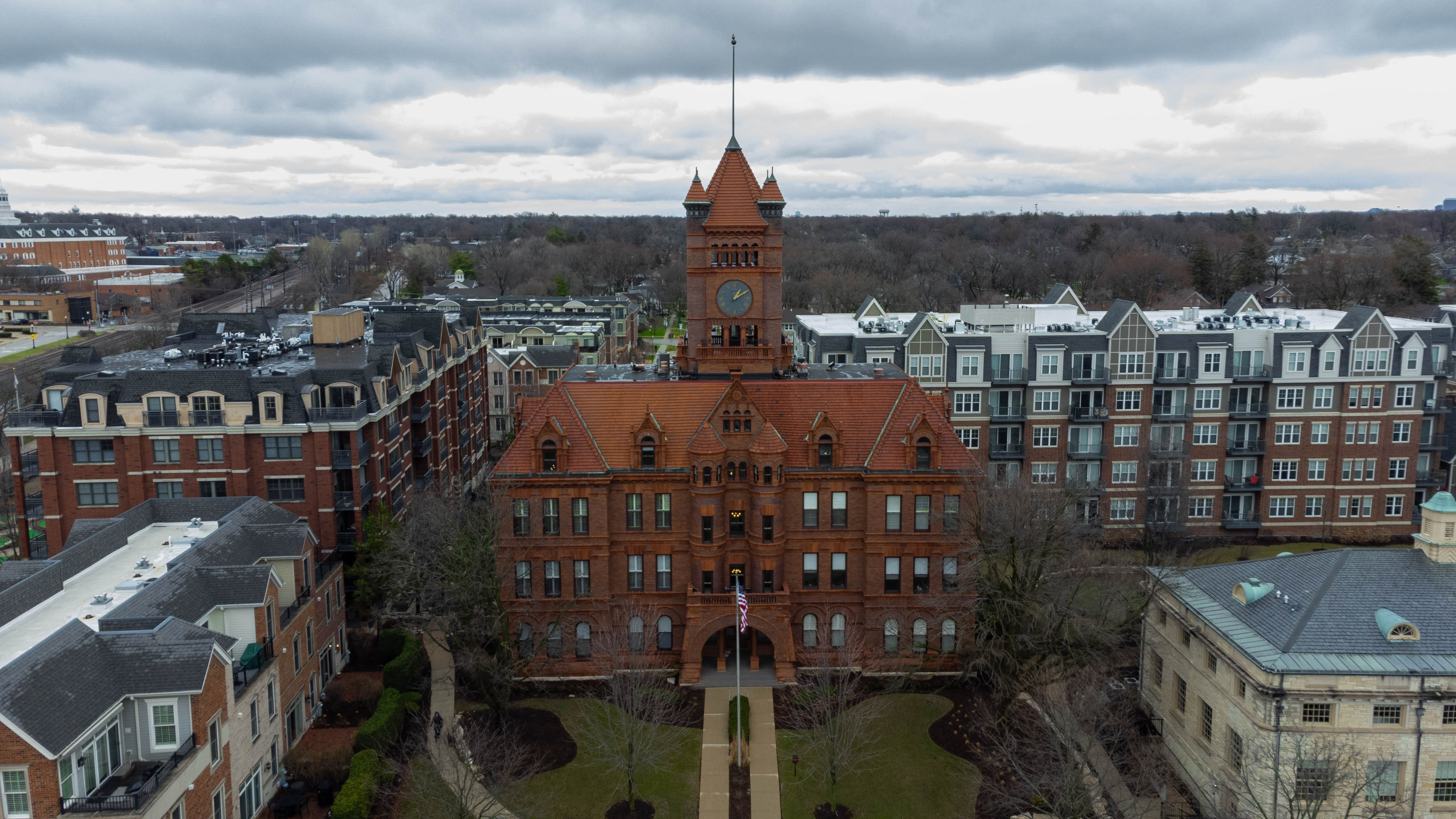
The Old DuPage County Courthouse (2022)

In 1857, the Illinois state legislature authorized an election to be held to decide the question of whether the DuPage county seat should remain in Naperville or be moved to the more centrally located Wheaton, which was on the Galena and Chicago Union Railroad. Naperville won the election by a vote of 1,542 to 762. Hostility between the two towns continued for the next decade and another election was held in 1867, in which Wheaton narrowly won by a vote of 1,686 to 1,635. At a cost of $20,000, the City of Wheaton quickly built a courthouse to house a courtroom, county offices, and a county jail. The building was dedicated on July 4, 1868.

However, animosity between the two towns continued, and in 1868, as records were moved from the Naperville courthouse to the new courthouse in Wheaton, Naperville refused to turn over the remaining county records, prompting a band of Civil War veterans from Wheaton to conduct what came to be known as the "Midnight Raid" on the Naperville courthouse. As Wheatonites fled back on Wheaton-Naperville Road, Napervillians were able to secure some of the last remaining records, which were then taken to the Cook County Recorder in Chicago for safekeeping. During that time, Naperville was mounting a lawsuit against Wheaton accusing election judges of leaving their posts for lunch during the vote when duplicate ballot stuffing allegedly occurred. As the courts deliberated the fate of the county seat, the records were destroyed in the Great Chicago Fire of 1871. Shortly thereafter, Wheaton was officially proclaimed the county seat.

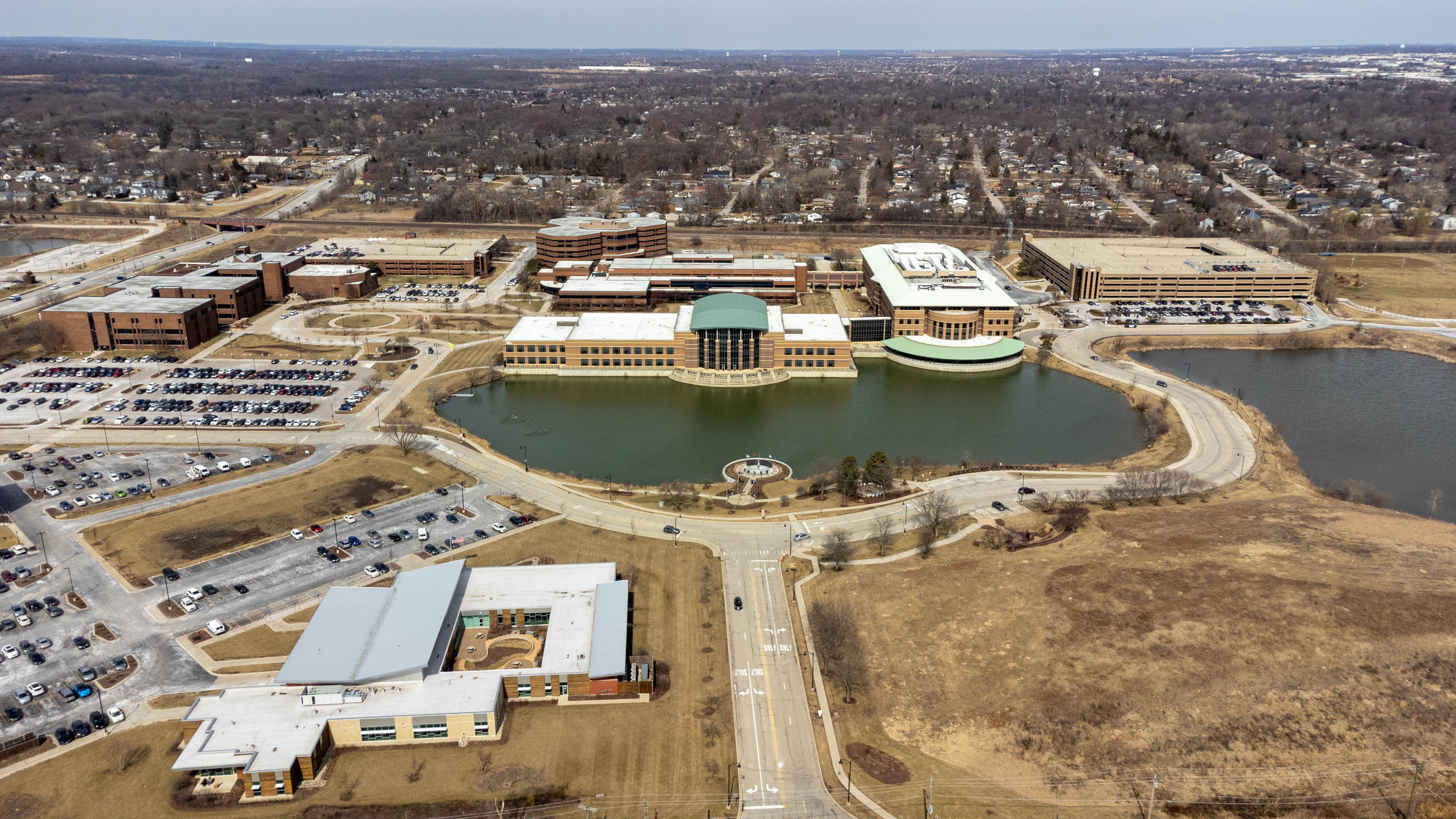
The DuPage county court complex (2022)

As demand for space increased, the courthouse was rebuilt in 1887 at a cost of $69,390, modeled after the courthouse in Aledo. This structure was used for the next 94 years until the county's rapid growth prompted the building of a brand new complex. The old courthouse is listed on the National Register of Historic Places, and was formerly used by National Louis University until National Louis moved to Lisle in 2004. It is being developed into luxury condominiums.

On November 2, 1990, the courthouse moved to a building about two miles (3.2 km) west in a new 57-acre (23 ha) complex at the corner of County Farm Road and Manchester Road. It was built at a cost of $52,500,000 and includes a 300,000-square-foot (30,000 m^{2}) judicial building. In 1992, the county sued the architect and contractor for $4 million after several employees became ill from the ventilation system. In the end, however, the county received only $120,000 for minor repairs and the jury sided with the defendants, finding that the alleged problems were caused, primarily, by the county's negligent operation and maintenance of the ventilation system.

=== Expansion ===
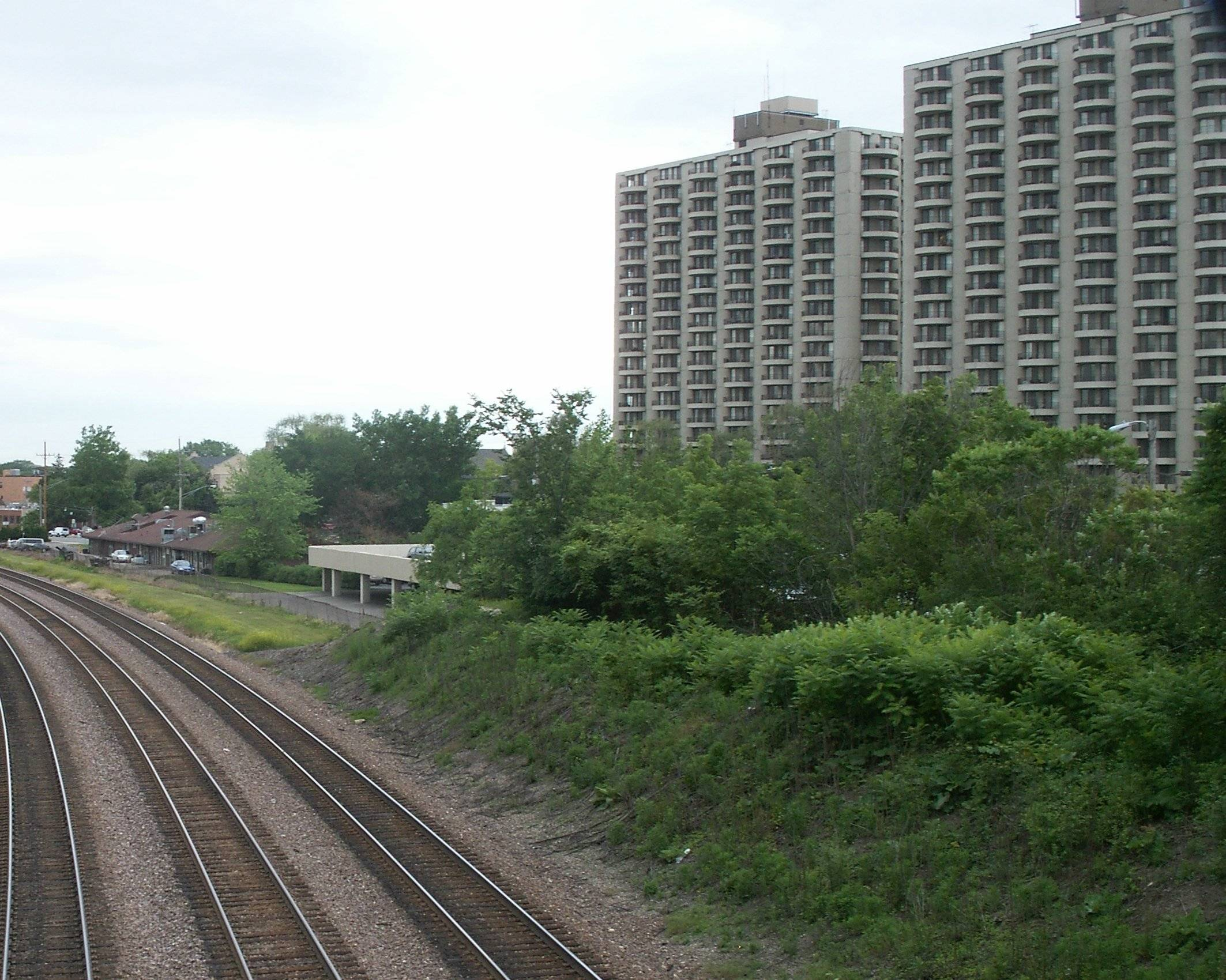
Wheaton Center is seen, from a pedestrian bridge over Union Pacific Railroad tracks

Wheaton has rapidly expanded since the 1950s, although population growth has slowed since the early 1990s, as the city has become increasingly landlocked. Downtown lost much business after the county courthouse facility moved two miles (3.2 km) west in 1990, but in the decade since, the downtown has seen a renaissance of sorts, with the creation of several significant condominium and business developments. One of the most recognizable landmarks of the city is Wheaton Center, a 758-unit apartment complex on 14 acres (5.7 ha) in downtown Wheaton. The six building complex includes two twenty-story high-rise buildings built in 1975.

In 1887, Wheaton, which has a large evangelical Christian population, prohibited the sale of alcoholic beverages, a ban which lasted until 1985 and applied to all supermarkets, convenience stores, restaurants, and other establishments.

== Geography ==
According to the 2021 census gazetteer files, Wheaton has an area of 11.49 square miles (29.76 km^{2}), of which 11.32 square miles (29.32 km^{2}) (or 98.55%) is land and 0.17 square miles (0.44 km^{2}) (or 1.45%) is water.

== Demographics ==
Historical population
Census	Pop.	Note	%±
1860	645		—
1870	998		54.7%
1880	1,160		16.2%
1890	1,622		39.8%
1900	2,345		44.6%
1910	3,423		46.0%
1920	4,137		20.9%
1930	7,258		75.4%
1940	7,389		1.8%
1950	11,638		57.5%
1960	24,312		108.9%
1970	31,138		28.1%
1980	43,043		38.2%
1990	51,464		19.6%
2000	55,416		7.7%
2010	52,894		−4.6%
2020	53,970		2.0%
U.S. Decennial Census

=== Racial and ethnic composition ===
Wheaton city, Illinois – Racial and ethnic composition Note: the US Census treats Hispanic/Latino as an ethnic category. This table excludes Latinos from the racial categories and assigns them to a separate category. Hispanics/Latinos may be of any race.
Race / Ethnicity (NH = Non-Hispanic)	Pop 2000	Pop 2010	Pop 2020	% 2000	% 2010	% 2020
White alone (NH)	48,494	44,232	41,819	87.51%	83.62%	77.49%
Black or African American alone (NH)	1,525	2,324	2,251	2.75%	4.39%	4.17%
Native American or Alaska Native alone (NH)	50	55	41	0.09%	0.10%	0.08%
Asian alone (NH)	2,680	2,708	4,021	4.84%	5.12%	7.45%
Pacific Islander alone (NH)	11	12	4	0.02%	0.02%	0.01%
Other race alone (NH)	45	58	201	0.08%	0.11%	0.37%
Mixed race or Multiracial (NH)	588	888	2,129	1.06%	1.68%	3.94%
Hispanic or Latino (any race)	2,023	2,617	3,504	3.65%	4.95%	6.49%
Total	55,416	52,894	53,970	100.00%	100.00%	100.00%

=== 2020 census ===
As of the 2020 census, there were 53,970 people, 19,948 households, and 13,122 families residing in the city. The population density was 4,699.17 inhabitants per square mile (1,814.36/km^{2}).

The median age was 39.0 years. 22.0% of residents were under the age of 18 and 17.5% of residents were 65 years of age or older. For every 100 females there were 94.3 males, and for every 100 females age 18 and over there were 91.0 males age 18 and over. Of the population, 100% of residents live in urban areas.

There were 19,948 households in Wheaton, of which 30.6% had children under the age of 18 living in them. Of all households, 57.5% were married-couple households, 13.8% were households with a male householder and no spouse or partner present, and 24.8% were households with a female householder and no spouse or partner present. About 26.7% of all households were made up of individuals and 11.8% had someone living alone who was 65 years of age or older.

There were 20,885 housing units (an average density of 1,818.46 units per square mile (702.11 units/km^{2})), of which 4.5% were vacant. The homeowner vacancy rate was 1.3% and the rental vacancy rate was 7.0%.

Racial composition as of the 2020 census
Race	Number	Percent
White	42,641	79.0%
Black or African American	2,303	4.3%
American Indian and Alaska Native	89	0.2%
Asian	4,047	7.5%
Native Hawaiian and Other Pacific Islander	6	0.0%
Some other race	1,208	2.2%
Two or more races	3,676	6.8%
Hispanic or Latino (of any race)	3,504	6.5%

=== Income ===
The median income for a household in the city was $105,764, and the median income for a family was $129,579. Males had a median income of $73,771 versus $40,560 for females. The per capita income for the city was $51,688. About 3.3% of families and 5.7% of the population were below the poverty line, including 5.0% of those under age 18 and 7.3% of those age 65 or over.

In August 2010, the city was listed among the "Top 25 Highest Earning Towns" on CNN Money, citing a median family income of $113,517, and a median home price of $328,866, based on 2009 figures.

== Economy ==
According to the City of Wheaton's 2025 Comprehensive Annual Financial Report, the top employers in the city were:

#	Employer	# of Employees
1	DuPage County Government Center	2824
2	Community Unit School District 200	1884
6	Wheaton Park District	495
3	Wheaton College	769
8	Forest Preserve District Dupage County	317
5	Marianjoy Rehabilitation Hospital	585
4	First Trust Partners	670
9	Wyndemere Senior Living Campus	305
10	Jewel-Osco (2 stores)	265
7	City of Wheaton	322

=== Business districts ===
Wheaton boasts a vibrant downtown with many restaurants, shops and services. The Downtown Wheaton Association hosts many events throughout the year to promote local businesses, including The French Market, The Chili Cookoff, Vintage Rides, Boo-palooza (Downtown Wheaton Trick-or-Treat), A Dickens of a Christmas, Wheaton Wedding Walk and Wheaton's Wine & Cultural Arts Festival.

Downtown Wheaton is home to perhaps one of the narrowest stores in the Chicago area. The Little Popcorn Store on Front Street was formerly an alley between two buildings, and features the exposed brick walls of its neighbors. The store has been around since the 1920s and not only sells fresh popcorn, but candy for as little as 1¢ apiece.

Other shopping districts in Wheaton include Danada Square West, and Danada Square East, named after Dan and Ada Rice, located on the north side of Illinois Route 56 (Butterfield Road), on the west and east side of Naperville Road. Just east of Danada Square East is Rice Lake Square, another open air shopping center. Just north of Danada Square East, along Naperville Road, is Town Square Wheaton, which was built in 1992, and is a mixed-use lifestyle center featuring clothing boutiques and restaurants. Other shopping areas include the Roosevelt Road and Geneva Road corridors.

== Arts and culture ==
=== Fairgrounds ===
Wheaton is home to the DuPage County Fairgrounds. Organized in 1954, the DuPage County Fair Association hosts the annual DuPage County Fair in late July. The fair annually attracts major entertainers including Ashlee Simpson, Plain White T's (2007), Travis Tritt, Jesse McCartney, Jars of Clay, Corbin Bleu (2008), The Academy Is..., The Original Wailers (2009), and Danny Gokey (2010).

=== Theater ===
Wheaton is also home to the historic Grand Theater, built in 1925. In recent years, the theater and volunteers undertook a restoration to its original state, complete with a lighted dome ceiling dotted with stars, and a newly painted floor. It celebrated its grand reopening on May 11, 2002, and on August 25, 2005, the theater was placed on the National Register of Historic Places. There was a sense of growing pessimism that the theater would ever be restored, due to lack of progress and funds. However, there was cause for hope when on January 23, 2010, when many cast members of the off-Broadway show Jersey Boys raised approximately $50,000 for restoration.

On July 10, 2010, the Grand Theater Corp. surrendered the deed to the building, to Suburban Bank and Trust Co, due in part to being delinquent on a $800,000 loan, carried by Suburban Bank and Trust Co.

On November 30, 2012, Jim Atten bought the building, intending to reopen it soon. Since then he has been repairing the property and leading the effort to remove temporary structures within the theater. He has worked closely with an architect and the city staff as the effort progresses. According to the Daily Herald newspaper, it will take an estimated $5 million to get the theater up and running again.

=== Public library ===
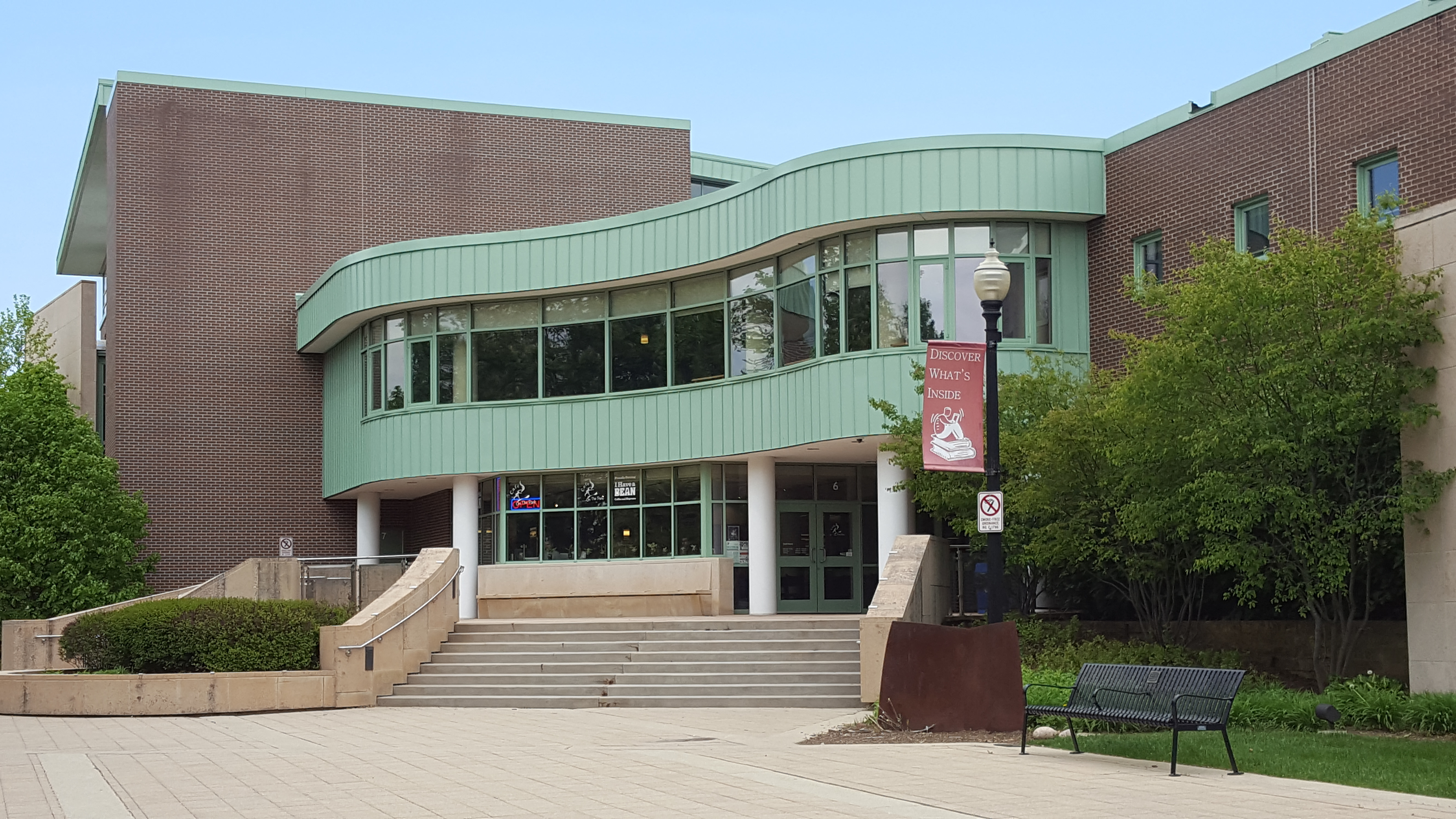
A view of Cafe on the Park, located at the back of the Wheaton Public library

The Wheaton Public Library is frequently ranked as one of the top ten libraries in the nation compared to other libraries serving similarly sized populations. In 2006, a three-story addition was added, followed by significant renovations which were completed in 2007, to bring the square footage up from 74,000 to 124,000. The annual public library budget in 2018 was $4.084 million. As of 2019, the total circulation was 1,013,326, the number of items in the collection was 262,745, and the number of visitors was 525,711. The previous public library was converted into the DuPage County Historical Museum, between 1965 and 1967.

In May 2016, the library opened The Bean Café, a small coffee shop located just inside the Wheaton Public Library's park-side (west) entrance.

== Parks and recreation ==
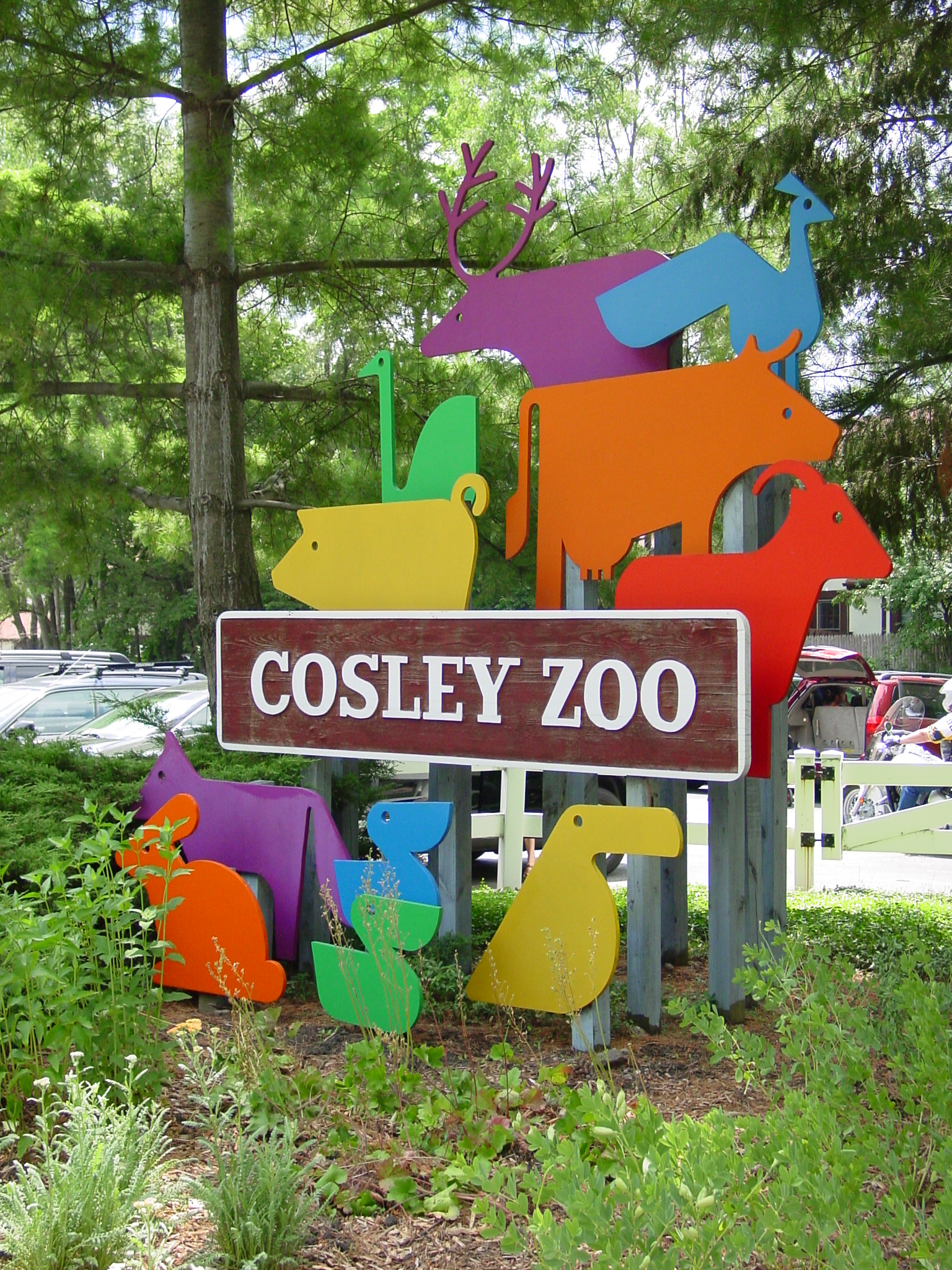
Cosley Zoo in Wheaton

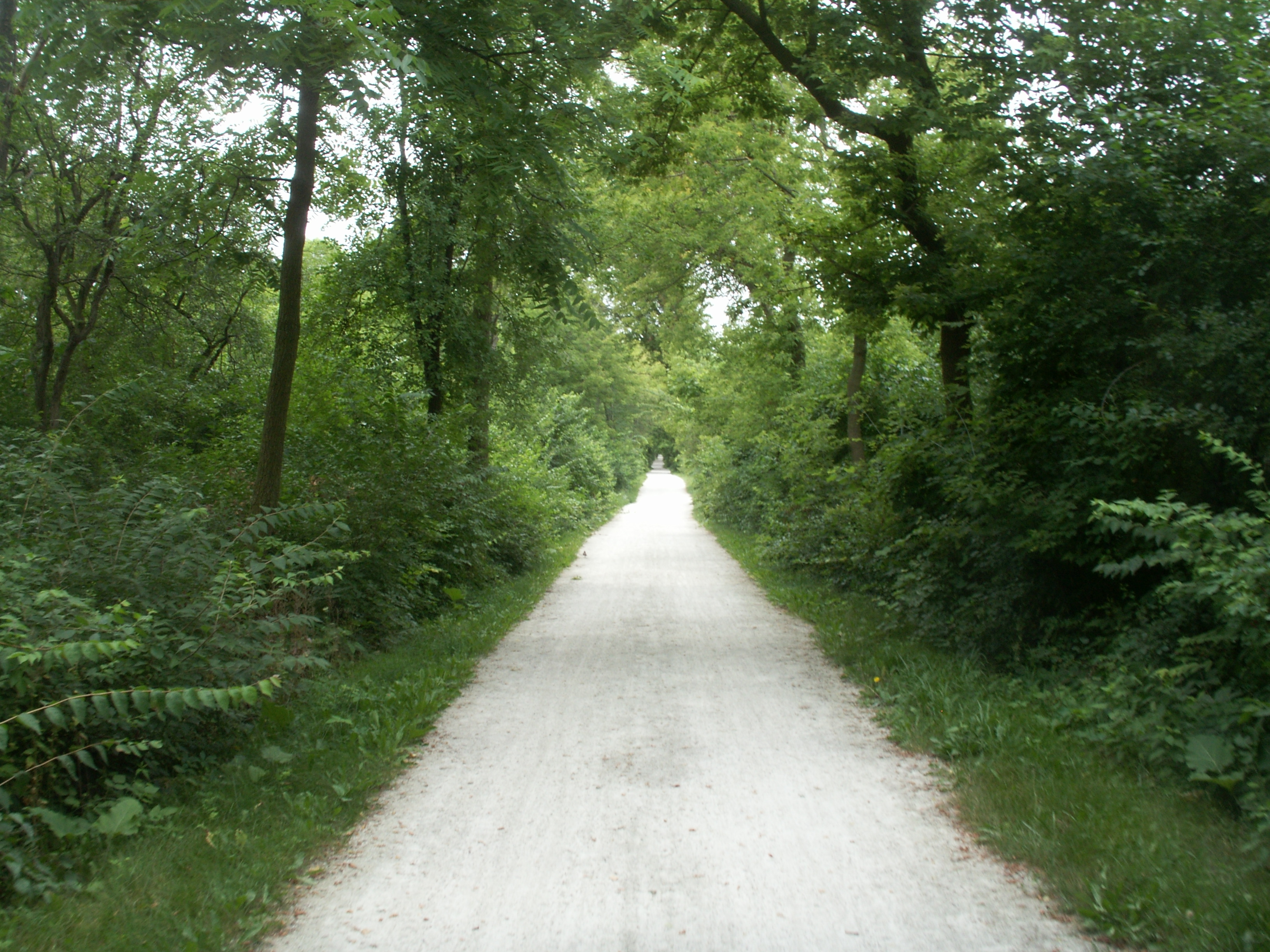
The Illinois Prairie Path in Wheaton

=== Parks and golf ===
- The Wheaton Park District oversees 52 parks covering more than 800 acres (320 ha), including:
  - The 135-acre (55 ha) Lincoln Marsh Natural Area, with over 300 species of prairie and wetland plants and animals, and a ropes course.
  - Cosley Zoo, founded in 1974, housing over 200 animals that represent over 70 species.
  - Two public swimming pools, the Northside Family Aquatic Center, and the Rice Pool and Water Park.
  - The Arrowhead Golf Club, renamed in 1929 from the Antlers Golf Club, which was built in 1924. A new clubhouse was built in 2004–2005.
  - The Chicago Golf Club is a nearby prestigious private golf club that is located south of Wheaton.
- Cantigny, the former estate of Chicago Tribune owner Robert R. McCormick, contains extensive formal and stylized gardens and two museums, one relating to the Chicago Tribune, and the other devoted to the First Division of the United States Army, as Robert McCormick was a colonel in the First Division during World War I. Adjacent to the park to the south is Cantigny's public golf course.
- The Illinois Prairie Path runs throughout Wheaton.

== Government ==
In the United States House of Representatives, Wheaton is located both in Illinois's 3rd congressional district, which is held by Democrat Delia Ramirez, and Illinois's 6th congressional district, which is held by Democrat Sean Casten.

== Education ==
=== Higher education ===
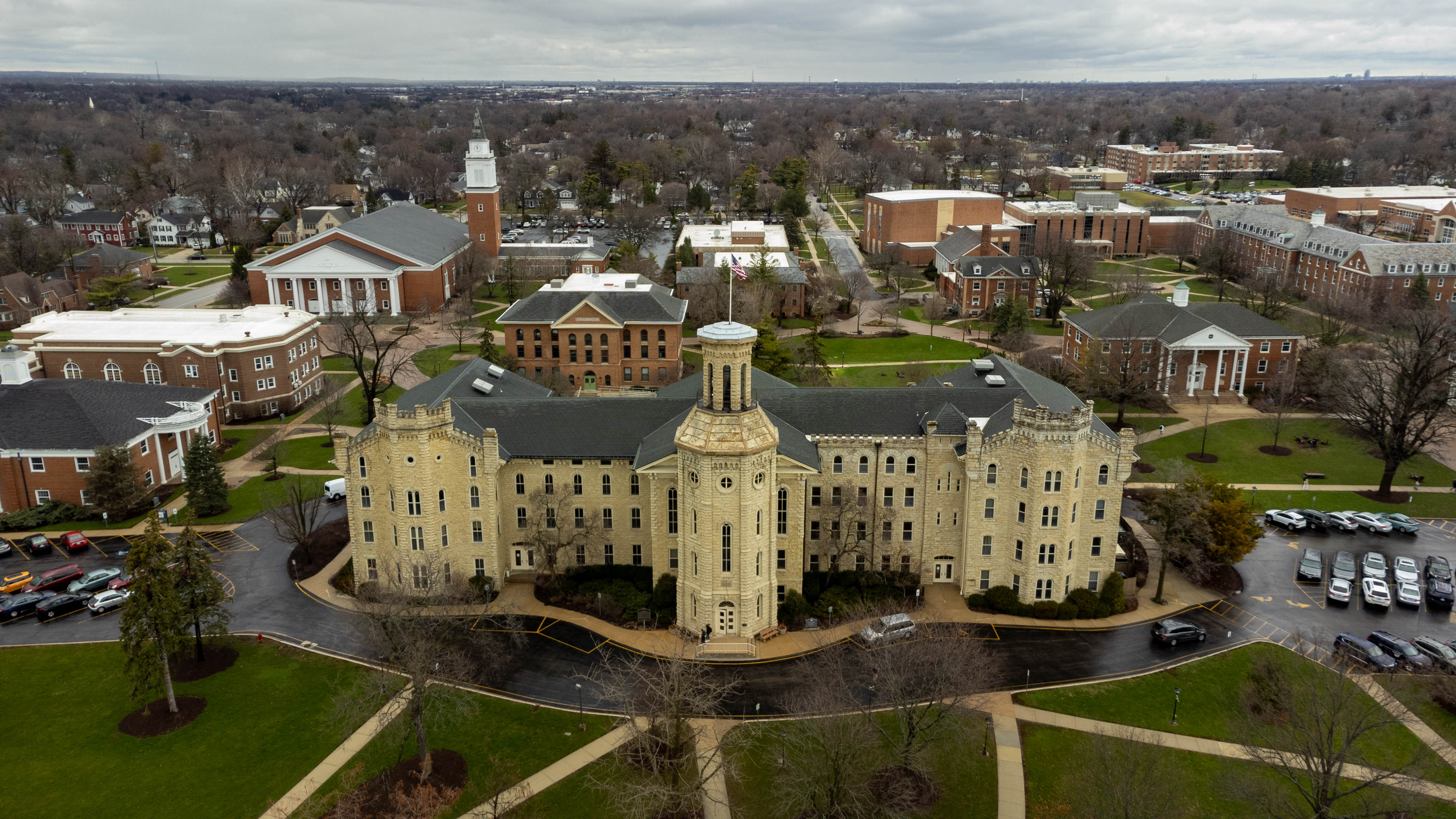
Blanchard Hall at Wheaton College

Wheaton College is located just east of downtown Wheaton. Sometimes referred to as "The Harvard of Evangelical schools", Wheaton College is known for being an interdenominational destination school for devout Christian students seeking an elite liberal arts education.

Wheaton's campus features the Billy Graham Center, named for the college's most famous alumnus, which contains a museum dedicated to both the history of American evangelism and the international ministry of Billy Graham. It features conceptual exhibits intended to convey Christian ideas. Wheaton College is also home to the Todd M. Beamer Student Center, which was dedicated on October 1, 2004, to the memory of Todd Beamer, a hero from United Airlines Flight 93, and two other Wheaton alumni who died in the September 11 attacks.

The Daniel F. and Ada L. Rice Campus of the Illinois Institute of Technology is also located in Wheaton, and is home to the School of Applied Technology and offers technology-oriented education and training for working professionals.

=== Private schools ===
Several of the private schools in Wheaton are located near the town center; in addition, St. Francis High School is on the far west side of town. Wheaton Academy moved to West Chicago in 1945, and Wheaton Christian Grammar School moved to a new campus in Winfield in 2010, while still retaining its name.

==== Pre-school through eighth grade ====
- Clapham School, founded in 2005, is a classical school with students from pre-K through high school.
- Prairie School of DuPage is located on the grounds of the Theosophical Society in America.
- St John Lutheran School serves students in preschool.
- St Michael Catholic Elementary School serves 580 students in preschool through eighth grade.
- Wheaton Montessori School serves children ages 3–12 and is accredited by the Association Montessori International.

==== High schools ====
- St. Francis High School serves 726 students in ninth through twelfth grade.

=== Public schools ===
Most of Wheaton is part of Community Unit School District 200. The Wheaton public school system is regularly listed among the finest in Illinois, with the School Board receiving the fifth consecutive Governance Award in 2020, from the Illinois Association of School Boards. A few families in the northeast corner of Wheaton reside in Glen Ellyn School District 41, and one elementary school that is located in the southeastern part of Wheaton, Briar Glen Elementary School, is part of Community Consolidated School District 89.

==== High schools ====
- Wheaton North – consists of students from Monroe and Franklin Middle Schools
- Wheaton Warrenville South – consists of students from Edison and Hubble Middle Schools

==== Middle schools ====
- Edison – funnels into Wheaton Warrenville South High School
- Hubble (Warrenville) - funnels into Wheaton Warrenville South High School
- Franklin – funnels into Wheaton North High School
- Monroe – funnels into Wheaton North High School

==== Elementary schools ====
- Briar Glen (in CCSD 89)
- Emerson
- Hawthorne
- Lincoln
- Longfellow
- Lowell
- Madison
- Sandburg
- Washington
- Whittier
- Wiesbrook

== Infrastructure ==
=== Transportation ===
==== Rail ====
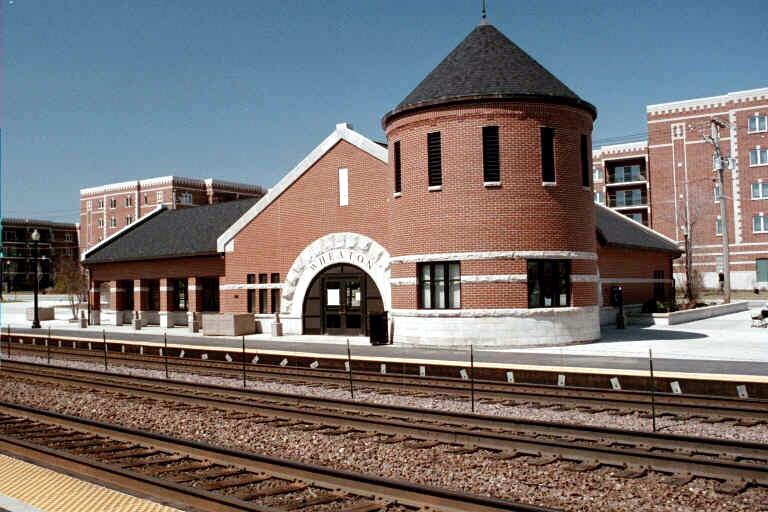
Downtown Wheaton train station, rebuilt in 2000

The Union Pacific West Line runs through downtown Wheaton and has been a staple of the city since its founding in the mid-1800s. Metra has two stops along the line in Wheaton, one at College Avenue serving Wheaton College, and another at West Street in the heart of the commercial district. It passes under a bridge just west of downtown, and over County Farm Road, just north of the DuPage County Government Complex.

Wheaton was also served by the Chicago Aurora and Elgin Railroad with passenger and freight service from 1902 to 1959. The CA&E right-of-way now constitutes the Illinois Prairie Path, one of the first rail trails. Carlton Avenue, UP Railroad, West Street, and Childs Street are the borders of the former site of the CA&E's headquarters and storage and maintenance facilities.

==== Bus ====
Pace provides bus service on multiple routes connecting Wheaton to Forest Park, Naperville, and other destinations.

==== Highways ====
- Illinois Route 38, also known as Roosevelt Road.
- Illinois Route 56, also known as Butterfield Road.
- Illinois Route 64, also known as North Avenue.

=== Health care ===
Established in 1972 by the Wheaton Franciscan Sisters, Marianjoy Rehabilitation Hospital is a rehabilitation hospital located in a small unincorporated enclave on the west side of Wheaton on Roosevelt Road. It has been operated by Northwestern Medicine, since 2016. Marianjoy is a nonprofit hospital dedicated to the delivery of physical medicine and rehabilitation, with 127 beds.

=== Religious institutions ===
Wheaton has 45 churches located within city limits and an additional 30 places of worship in outlying unincorporated areas, representing nearly 35 religious denominations. The Genius Edition of Trivial Pursuit said that Wheaton has "more churches per capita than any other town in America."

Built in 1926, the national headquarters of the Theosophical Society in America is located on a 42-acre (17 ha) estate on the north side of Wheaton. Wheaton is also the North American headquarters for the Institute of the Blessed Virgin Mary, which moved there in June 1946.

On March 18, 2002, St. Michael Catholic Church in downtown Wheaton was destroyed by arson by a Wheaton resident and parishioner, Adam Palinski, serving 39 years in prison. He lost his appeal, but still maintains his innocence. The church has since been rebuilt at a cost of $13 million, and reopened on March 18, 2006.

== Sister cities ==
Wheaton has been a sister city of Karlskoga, Sweden since 1973. Karlskoga Street in Wheaton is named after the Swedish city. In February 1990, Wheaton also became a sister city of Wheaton Aston, England.
