= Etonkids International Educational Group =

- China

Information
- Type: Private Day School
- Grades: Pre-K and Kindergarten
- Language: English
- Website: en.etonkids.com

Etonkids International Educational Group (simplified Chinese: 伊顿国际教育集团; traditional Chinese: 伊頓國際教育集團) is an early education and K-12 services provider in the People's Republic of China.

The group operates three kindergarten brands: Etonkids International Kindergarten (simplified Chinese: 伊顿国际幼儿园; Traditional Chinese: 伊頓國際幼兒園); Etonkids Bilingual Kindergarten (Simplified Chinese: 伊顿双语幼儿园; Traditional Chinese: 伊頓雙語幼兒園); and Etonkids Huizhi Kindergarten (Simplified Chinese: 伊顿慧智幼儿园; Traditional Chinese: 伊頓慧智幼兒園).

The group manages kindergarten campuses in major Chinese cities and China's only indigenous American Montessori Society affiliated teacher-credentialing program. The group's headquarters are in Beijing, China.

== Group details ==
=== History ===
Founded in 2002, Etonkids states "our goal is to improve overall early education standards in China through establishing the country's leading family of kindergartens." The school is based in Beijing. In 2022, the company's almost 60 kindergartens were based in 18 cities in China. It had over 3,000 employees and over 13,000 students that year.

== Programs ==
=== Etonkids International Kindergarten ===
Etonkids International Kindergartens feature a native English-speaking teacher in every classroom, and caters largely to wealthy Chinese families, with a minority of student coming from expatriate families. A mixture of English and Chinese is used in the classrooms.

=== Etonkids Bilingual Kindergarten ===
Etonkids Bilingual Kindergarten features native English and Chinese speaking teachers in the classroom and hosts a mixture of expatriate and local Chinese and families.

=== Etonkids Huizhi Kindergarten ===
Etonkids Huizhi Kindergarten caters largely to local Chinese families seeking international style Montessori bilingual early education.

=== Other programs ===
Etonkids campuses offer extra-curricular activities that vary by school term. These include areas of art and dance, various sports and martial arts, themes in ESL and CSL.

Etonkids Beginnings classes are held weekly at Etonkids campuses and are usually centered on a musical or artistic theme in which moms and dads and babies 18 months or younger bond with one another and interact with other families.

== Training ==
=== Montessori teaching credentials ===
Etonkids' Montessori teacher credentialing programs are MACTE-accredited and AMS-affiliated, and are offered in both English and Chinese. The course consists of a summer intensive session followed by an academic year-long internship inside a Montessori classroom. The Early Childhood or Nursery Montessori credential is awarded to graduates.
