= Philip Snow Gang =

American educator

- Education: Forest Hills High School
- Occupations: Academic; educator; historian
- Known for: Montessori education in the United States

Philip Snow Gang is the founder and dean of The Institute for Educational Studies (TIES), a Montessori academic, an historian, and an eco-cosmological educator.

In the mid 1980s, Gang, in collaboration with Ron Miller, helped to popularize the term "holistic education", and he served as a leading advocate for the movement on the international stage. Gang also collaborated with the United Nations' University for Peace which helped plant the seeds to create the Global Alliance for Transforming Education, and was an important figure in popularizing the Montessori schooling methods for use in the United States.

== Early life ==
Philip Snow Gang was the son of George and Fannie Gang. George owned Anoroc Products, manufacturing glass and aluminum for shower and patio doors, which he ran with Philip's brother Daniel. Gang attended Forest Hills High School.

== Career ==
=== Montessori schooling ===
In 1967, Gang first came into contact with Montessori at the Ashdun Hall Montessori, one of the first schools opened during the re-emergence of Montessori schools in the 1960s in the United States. In 1973, Gang moved his family to Italy to study the Montessori Elementary Education Method at the Centro Internazionale Di Studi Montessoriani. There, he was trained by the Italians Eleanor Honegger and Camillo Grazzini, who delivered most lectures in a combination of Italian and English.

=== Academia ===
In 1984, Gang met Robert Muller, then Assistant Secretary of the United Nations. Muller had previously released the "World Core Curriculum", and Gang noticed many similarities to Maria Montessori's cosmic education. Muller collaborated with Gang to initiate the Global Alliance for Transforming Education, which was released in 1990. This initiative was set into motion with the 1990 publication of "The Chicago Statement on Education".

In the late 1980s Gang took part in the Global Thinking Project. As a citizen diplomat, he traveled to Russia and was in dialogue with teachers, principals and directors of the Soviet Academy. Most significant was the Siberian lecture on ecology where he presented Our Planet Our Home.

In 1990, Gang was appointed as the executive director of the newly formed Global Alliance for Transforming Education (GATE), an initiative co-founded with Ron Miller and Edward Clark, and strongly influenced Miller. GATE also released "Education 2000: A Holistic Perspective" in 1991, which offered ten principles of holistic education. He presented these concepts to audiences throughout Europe, Asia, North and South America, and Oceania.

== Published works ==
- Gang, P. S. Rethinking Education. ISBN 0-9623783-0-5.
- Gang, P. S. Conscious Education. ISBN 0-9623783-2-1.
