= Caedmon School =

Montessori school in Manhattan, New York

Coordinates: 40°46′21.22″N 73°57′4.57″W

The Caedmon School
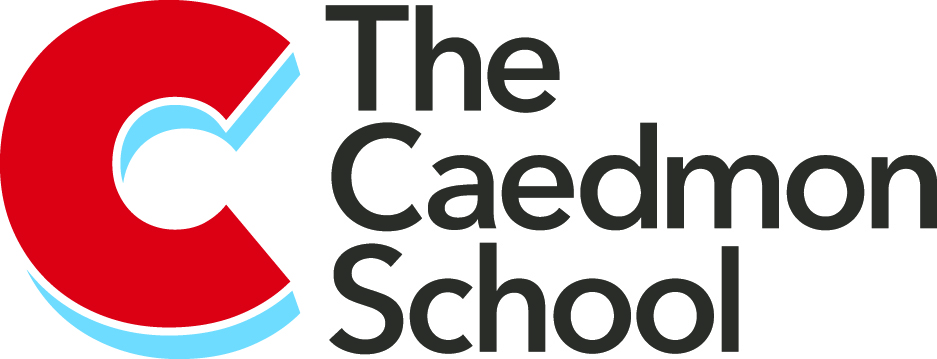

Location
- 416 East 80th Street; New York City, New York, Manhattan 10075; United States

Information
- Type: Montessori, independent, coeducational
- Established: 1962
- Head of school: Wendy A. Falchuk
- Faculty: 75
- Grades: Nursery – 5th grade
- Enrollment: 250
- Campus: Urban
- Accreditation: Association of Independent Schools of New England; American Montessori Society
- Tuition: $23,265 – $65,505 (2025–2026)
- Communities served: Upper East Side
- Affiliation: NAIS, AISNE, AMS, MSM, IMC
- Website: caedmonschool.org

The Caedmon School is an independent, coeducational preschool and elementary school located on the Upper East Side of Manhattan in New York City. It is a Montessori preschool and progressive Montessori elementary school. It was the first Montessori school established in New York City and the second in the United States.

Founded in 1962, the school currently enrolls approximately 250 students from nursery through fifth grade.

== About ==
The school is located in a large former rectory on East 80th Street between First Avenue and York Avenue on the Upper East Side. The school employs a curriculum based on four foundational concepts: community, diversity, Montessori and academic excellence. With a faculty of over 50, the student to teacher ratio is approximately 4:1 in Early Childhood classrooms and 6:1 in Elementary classrooms. Class sizes range from 12 to 20 students, with three teachers per class in Early Childhood and two teachers per class in Elementary.

The Caedmon School operates mixed-aged classes of children as young as 3 through the second grade. Kindergarten and third through fifth Grade are dedicated to a single age group. Following graduation from Caedmon, the school's fifth grade students attend some of New York's most competitive college preparatory schools. In recent years, Caedmon students have moved on to a variety of schools, including Allen-Stevenson, Brearley, Browning, Chapin, Collegiate, Columbia Prep, Dalton, Horace Mann, Nightingale-Bamford and Spence.

The following are Caedmon's nine age-based educational programs across pre-school and elementary school:

- Beginners (age 1.8 to 2.8)
- Early Program (age 3–4)
- Elementary (kindergarten through 5th grade)

Tuition at Caedmon for the 2025–2026 school year ranges from $24,000 per year for the Half-Day Preschool classes class to $67,500 per year for the elementary school program.

== Other programs ==
In addition to its core academic activities, Caedmon provides programs including Special Club Activities, Afterschool activities, Childminding, and the Caedmon School of Music music school, which offers private music lessons to children and adults regardless of enrollment at The Caedmon School.

Each summer, the school hosts the Caedmon Discovery Camp. This six-week program provides an educational summer experience built on the same core principles as the school's academic program.

== History ==
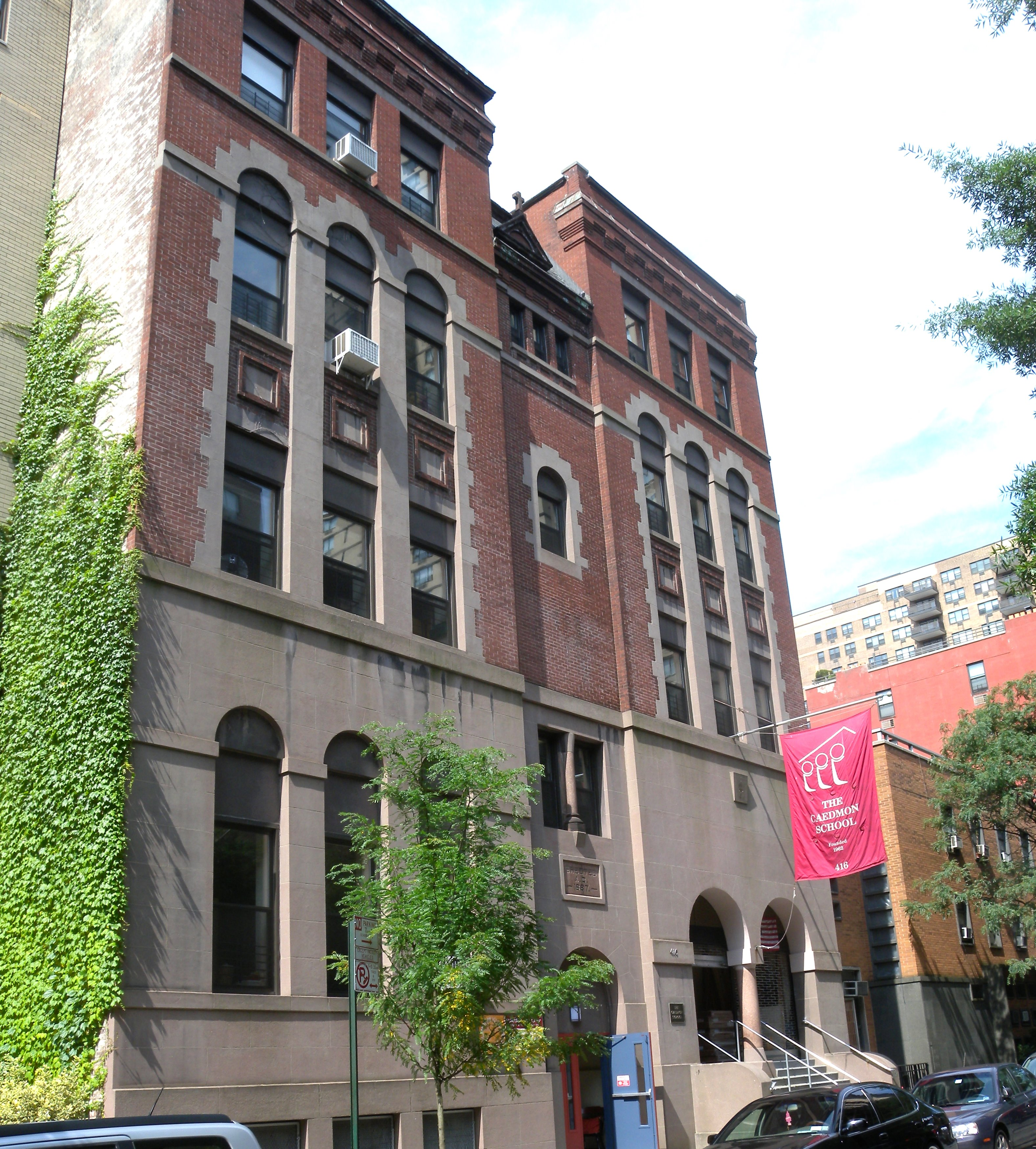
Front of the Caedmon School brownstone on East 80th Street

When the Caedmon School was founded in 1962, Montessori education was undergoing its second rise in popularity in the United States. In the late 1950s, Nancy McCormick Rambusch, who had undergone Montessori training in London, returned to the US with the idea of reviving Montessori education. She first founded the Whitby School in Greenwich, Connecticut, which became the flagship school of the American Montessori. In 1960, Rambusch founded the American Montessori Society (AMS).

Historical Caedmon logo

The Caedmon Cow, as drawn by Robert Rambusch c. 1962

By the fall of 1961, a group of ten families in New York City who had attended Rambusch's talks began planning a school. Like Whitby in Connecticut, Caedmon was conceived as a lay Catholic school, which would also be attractive to a diverse community of differing religions. Some of the families had conflicting goals on certain issues, including the location for the school and the inclusion of religious instruction. Some families separated to found their own school, which would later become the West Side Montessori School. The families that remained became Caedmon's founding trustees: Marilou and William Doyle; Elizabeth and Vincent Connelly; Joyce and Daniel Flynn; Nellie and Thomas Mahoney; and Robert Hurley. The Caedmon School was the first Montessori school established in New York City. At that time, Caedmon was the second Montessori school in the United States.

In 1969, Josephine Hartog assumed the position of head of school, which she held until 1974. She was succeeded by Nancy Rambusch, who led the school throughout the late 1970s. Rambusch, who had been instrumental in the reintroduction of Montessori schools in the US by adapting the program to better fit American educational culture, had a strong influence on the development of Caedmon. Also in the 1970s, Caedmon created what was then the first extended-day activities program among independent schools in Manhattan.

Carol Gose DeVine, who had joined Caedmon in 1970, was named head of school in 1979. She held that position until 2007, making her one of the longest-serving heads of an independent school in the New York area.

In the fall of 1994, Caedmon approached families for help in establishing a fund to support diversity at the school.

In 2002, the National Association of Independent Schools' Leading Edge Recognition program recognized Caedmon with its Curriculum Innovation award. In 2005, the school opened a new gymnasium and science facility.

During the 2012–2013 school year, Caedmon celebrated the 50th anniversary of its founding.

In 2019, New York Family named Caedmon its Blackboard Award Honoree.

=== Name ===
The school was named after Cædmon, the earliest recorded English poet. The founders of Caedmon chose a name that paid tribute to The Whitby School, the first Montessori school in the US, which had served as an inspiration for the Caedmon School. Cædmon was known to have been buried in the English town of Whitby, after which the Whitby School had itself been named.

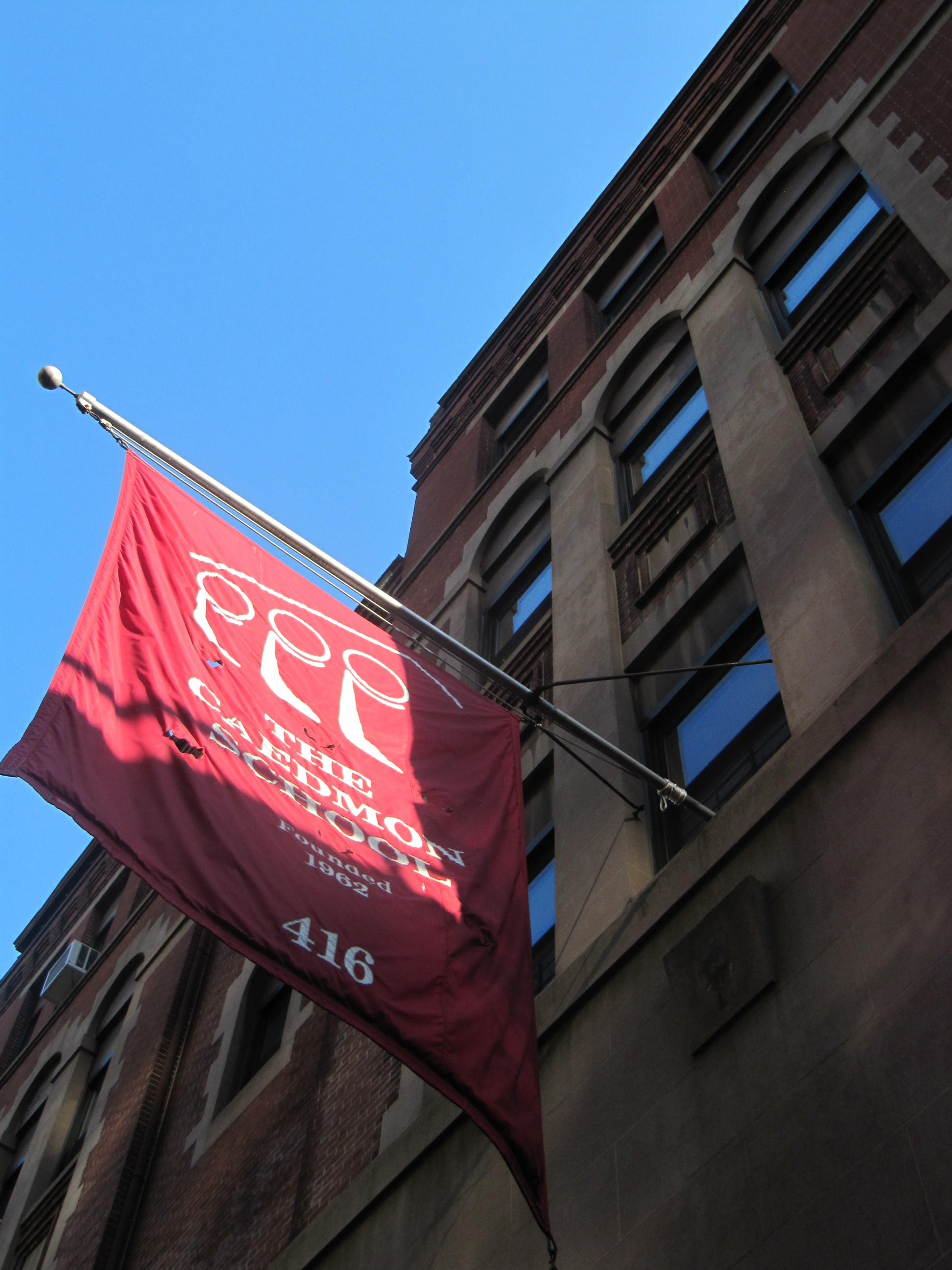
The front of the Caedmon School brownstone on East 80th Street
