= School of the Woods =

School of the Woods - Montessori

Location
- 1321 Wirt Road; Houston, Texas 77055; USA

Information
- Type: Private, Day
- Established: 1962
- Head of School: Sherry Herron
- Grades: PK–12
- Gender: Coeducational
- Campus type: Suburban
- Colors: Green, black and White
- Mascot: Wildcat
- Website: www.schoolofthewoods.org

School of the Woods is an independent primary and secondary school located at Hilshire Village, Texas, United States in Greater Houston, with a portion of the school property in Spring Branch, Houston. It offers educational programs from Early Childhood through 12th grade in a Montessori environment. It is accredited by the Southern Association of Colleges and Schools (SACS), and the Texas Alliance of Accredited Private Schools (TAAPS). The school holds a full level membership in the American Montessori Society (AMS).

School of the Woods is an independent, nonsectarian, nonprofit corporation.

In addition to its academic curricula, the school offers athletic and performing arts programs such as basketball, volleyball, soccer, instrumental music, dance, and drama.

== Location ==
The main office mailing address is 1321 Wirt Road, Houston, Texas 77055. While the school has a Houston address, the school campus straddles Wirt Road, with the high school on the property in Spring Branch and within the Houston city limits, and the other buildings inside the city limits of Hilshire Village.

== History ==
School of the Woods was founded by Dr. Ernest Wood and his wife Hilda Wood who was also a scholar and writer. The first class for pre-Kindergarten began in September 1962. The original classes served early childhood. Elementary and upper elementary were added as the school grew. A middle school with 7th and 8th grades was added in 1984. In the Fall of 1999 a high school was added with the first graduating class in the Fall of 2003.

== Notable alumni ==
- Dorian Electra, Musician, film-maker, and visual artist

== School membership(s) ==
- American Montessori Society (AMS).
- National Association for the Education of Young Children.
- State or regional independent school association.
