= Nancy McCormick Rambusch =

American educator (1927–1994)

- Born: Nancy McCormick; April 29, 1927; Milwaukee, Wisconsin, US
- Died: October 27, 1994 (aged 67); Princeton, New Jersey, US
- Education: University of Massachusetts Amherst (EdD); Columbia University (MA); University of Toronto (BA)
- Occupation: Educator
- Known for: Founder of the American Montessori Society and the Whitby School
- Movement: Montessori education

Nancy McCormick Rambusch (April 29, 1927 – October 27, 1994) was an American educator who founded the American Montessori Society in 1960. The founder of the Whitby School, Rambusch served as a leading proponent of Montessori education in the United States, writing and lecturing widely.

== Early life ==
Rambusch was born in Milwaukee, Wisconsin, on April 29, 1927, to parents Kathleen Wright, a schoolteacher, and Thomas McCormick, an ophthalmologist. A lifelong Roman Catholic, she attended parochial schools in the Milwaukee area and enrolled in Dominican University. Transferring to the University of Toronto, she earned a Bachelor of Arts degree in English with honors in 1949. While at Toronto, she encountered the writings of Maria Montessori. Rambusch went on to study French at the University of Paris and completed formal Montessori training in London in 1954.

== Career ==
Rambusch founded the Whitby School in Greenwich, Connecticut, and served as its first headmistress from 1958 to 1962. The establishment of the Whitby School sparked a large-scale revival of Montessori education in the United States. Rambusch founded the American Montessori Society (AMS) in 1960, headquartering the society at the school. Traveling widely to lecture and train teachers, she helped establish more than 400 Montessori schools around the United States. She authored the book Learning How to Learn: An American Approach to Montessori in 1962.

As she attempted to adapt Montessori's ideas to American society, Rambusch faced resistance from the Association Montessori Internationale (AMI) and its leader, Mario Montessori, the son of Maria Montessori. Frustrated by the lack of support she received from the larger Montessori movement, she stepped down as president of the American Montessori Society in early 1963. Soon afterward, the AMI ceased to recognize AMS as a Montessori affiliate. Guided by its first national director, Cleo Monson, the AMS has existed as an independent organization ever since.

After stepping down from the American Montessori Society, Rambusch pursued graduate degrees, organized Montessori teacher training programs nationwide, and held numerous leadership and self-described "change agent" positions in education and government. She earned a Master of Arts degree in early childhood education from Teachers College, Columbia University in 1963. She received her Doctor of Education degree from the University of Massachusetts Amherst in 1977. She worked for the New York Foundling and Mount Vernon City School District in the 1960s, headed the Caedmon School in Manhattan in the 1970s, taught at Tufts University, held a fellowship at Yale University from 1984 to 1986, and oversaw early childhood education at New York City's Agency of Child Development from 1985 to 1987. She became an associate professor of education at SUNY New Paltz in 1987 and was promoted to full professor in 1994.

Rambusch's papers are included in the American Montessori Society records, which are held at the University of Connecticut's Archives and Special Collections.

== Personal life ==
Nancy McCormick married liturgical designer Robert Edward Rambusch (1924–2017), a University of Toronto classmate, in 1951. The couple had two children, Rob and Alexandra.

Rambusch died of pancreatic cancer on October 27, 1994, at the Princeton Medical Center in New Jersey.
