= Montadale =

Breed of sheep

- Country of origin: United States

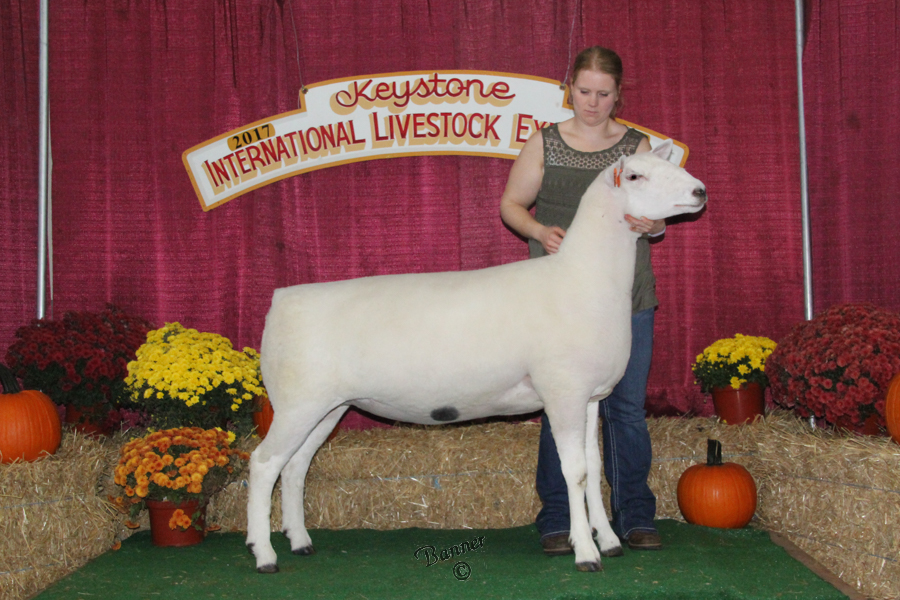
Champion Montadale ewe at Keystone International Livestock Expo 2018

Montadale is the name of a breed of domestic sheep developed in the 1930s by E. H. Mattingly, a Midwestern commercial lamb buyer who had a dream of developing the ideal sheep. He had been told that the best start to that goal would be to bring together the best characteristics of Midwestern mutton-type sheep and the big Western range sheep. The Montadale is considered a dual-purpose breed, raised for both wool and meat.

Mattingly selected the Cheviot and Columbia breeds as the basis for his project. The Cheviot is a small, hardy sheep developed in Scotland. It is known for its style, correctness, and muscling. The Columbia was developed in Wyoming and Idaho in the early 1900s. It is a large, big-bodied sheep with heavy, good quality fleeces. The average Montadale ram weighs 200 to 275 pounds and the ewe weighs 160 to 180 pounds.

The first cross of Columbia rams on Cheviot ewes proved to Mattingly that his project was on track. However, he also tried breeding Cheviot rams to Columbia ewes. This cross was even more successful, and was chosen as the foundation for the new breed. Montadale sheep have very white wool and little lanolin, which makes higher wool yields.

For nine years, the first Montadales were selected and line-bred to develop uniformity in breed characteristics and type. Then, the sheep were exhibited in competitions across the country. The breed quickly attracted the attention of progressive sheep producers. Montadale sheep were first imported to Canada in 1960.
