= Whitby School =

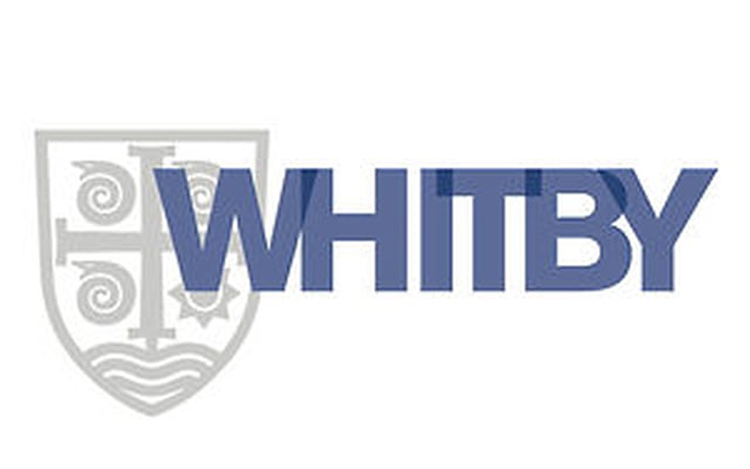

Location
- 969 Lake Avenue; Greenwich, CT 06831
- Coordinates: 41°06′51″N 73°39′14″W

Information
- School type: Independent; Montessori; International Baccalaureate
- Founded: 1958
- Founder: Nancy McCormick Rambusch
- Head of school: Jay Briar
- Grades: 18 months–8th Grade
- Enrollment: 340
- Campus size: 30 Acres
- Nickname: Wildcats
- Accreditation: AMS, IB, CAIS
- Website: www.whitbyschool.org

Whitby School is an independent, co-educational school in Greenwich, Connecticut, that was founded in 1958 and is accredited by the American Montessori Society (preschool through kindergarten), the International Baccalaureate Organization (grades 1-8), and the Connecticut Association of Independent Schools. The Head of School is Jay Briar.

== History ==
The school was founded by Nancy McCormick Rambusch, who subsequently established the American Montessori Society (AMS) in 1960. The founding of Whitby School is credited with initiating a Montessori revival. The school was named after Whitby Abbey in Yorkshire, England, where a traditional story tells of an abbess who recognized the musical talents of a stable boy and brought him into their educational program.

In 1960, the school moved from rented rooms at Sacred Heart School to its own campus. The school, through the AMS, became the first certified Montessori teacher training program in the United States. Rambusch and the AMS promoted a modified Montessori approach that facilitates transition of young students to traditional American schools, leading to a split from the Association Montessori Internationale (AMI).

Whitby's first two students graduated in 1962. A toddler class, "Stepping Stones," was created in 1975 to serve children between two and three years of age. By 1982, Stepping Stones was accepting children at eighteen months of age. In 2010, Whitby adopted the International Baccalaureate Primary Years Programme and Middle Years Programme, thus becoming the only school in the United States at the time to be triple-accredited.

== Facilities ==
Whitby School stands on 30 acres of land and its buildings have evolved over the years. In 2013, the school built a four-classroom addition, which provided rooms for third and fourth grade and a state-of-the-art design room and science room. This was followed in 2016 by the construction of an 11,860 square foot Athletics Center.

In 2016, Whitby acquired an additional five acres of land, bringing the school's campus to a total of 30.3 acres, allowing for an additional 16,000 square feet of building space, and providing the school with flexibility for further development. That year, the school collaborated with Brooklyn's Situ Studio added a Makerspace to its library, expanding on the philosophy that the library is a hub for all shared resources and not just books.

Whitby was certified in 2019 as "School Yard Habitat" that allows for curriculum enhancements and exploration outside the classroom. The habitat is also open to the public.

== Student life ==
Whitby is organized into three sections: The Montessori Children's House (18 months-Kindergarten), Lower School (Grades 1–4), and Middle School (Grades 5–8).

=== Montessori Children's House ===
Whitby's Montessori Children's House is divided into Stepping Stones (ages 18 months to 3 years) and Primary (ages 3–6), which are grouped into multiage classrooms each with three teachers providing individualized attention. The multiage nature of the classrooms encourages students to learn from their peers and for older students to build confidence and leadership skills.

=== Lower School ===
Lower School encompasses Grades 1–4. Through the International Baccalaureate Primary Years Programme curriculum, the school emphasizes conceptual-based, cross-disciplinary learning. Teachers work to create learning experiences that require using skills from multiple school topics. The end of Lower School is marked by the 4th Grade Exhibition. For this assignment, students select a topic of personal interest to research, consult experts and present to faculty, staff, parents, and fellow students.

=== Middle School ===
Spanning Grades 5–8, the Middle School follows the International Baccalaureate Middle Years Programme, which continues the emphasis of making real-world connections with in-class subject matter in subject-specific classes. There are also opportunities for interdisciplinary units where learning from multiple different classes supports a single idea or subject. At the end of Middle School, students participate in a student-led 8th Grade Project designed to extend knowledge and showcase multidisciplinary skill development.

== Community Service ==
A community-centered mindset is instilled at Whitby at an early age. Beginning in Primary, students are introduced to the school's Buddy Program where fifth grade students are paired with their younger counterparts as they first get to know each other and then work on service projects together. Beginning in 6th grade, students take part in service learning programs at outside organizations.

Community service for Whitby students culminates with the 7th and 8th grade service trip to a Spanish-speaking country. Using the Spanish language and culture skills, students work with local partner organizations in the country they are visiting. In recent years, the students worked with the Mariposa Foundation in the Dominican Republic.

== Extracurricular Programs ==
Whitby has an expansive program of classes that extend the academic day. Students have opportunities to select from a variety classes including chess, music lessons, Chinese classes, and Mathcounts. Whitby is a member of the Middle School Fairchester Athletic Association and competes with local schools over three seasons. The school offers soccer and cross country during the fall, basketball in the winter, and baseball, softball, tennis and cross country in the spring. The school also offers a robust visual and performing arts program for middle school students, including an annual musical production which includes student-designed sets.

== Secondary School Placement ==
Whitby has a dedicated secondary school placement team that works with students and parents to identify the best-fit high school for each graduating eighth grader. In recent years, multiple Whitby graduates have matriculated to Brunswick School, Choate Rosemary Hall, Green Farms Academy, Greenwich Academy, Greenwich Country Day School, King School, Masters School, Rye Country Day School, Phillips Academy Andover, and Phillips Exeter Academy.
