= Ernest Wood =

English yogi (1883–1965)

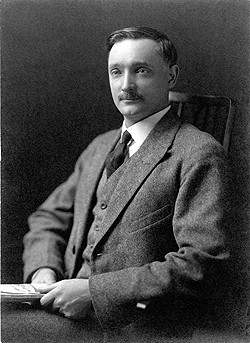
- Born: Ernest Egerton Wood; 18 August 1883; Manchester, England
- Died: 17 September 1965 (aged 82); Houston, Texas, United States
- Occupations: Theosophist, Sanskrit scholar, Indologist

Ernest Egerton Wood (18 August 1883 – 17 September 1965) was a noted English yogi, theosophist, Sanskrit scholar, and author of numerous books, including Concentration – An Approach to Meditation, Yoga and The Pinnacle of Indian Thought (1967).

== Youth and education ==
Born in Manchester, England, Wood was educated at the Manchester Municipal College of Technology, where he studied chemistry, physics and geology. Because of his interest in Buddhism and Yoga, he began studying Sanskrit in his late teens. He became president of his local Theosophist chapter in 1907 at age 24, then embraced the larger world by moving to Adyar, India, in 1908, the Society's world headquarters.

== Theosophy ==
As a young man, Wood became interested in Theosophy after listening to lectures by theosophist Annie Besant, whose personality greatly impressed him. He joined the society's Manchester lodge and in 1908 followed Besant, who had become President of the Theosophical Society Adyar, to India. Wood became one of her assistants, working with Besant and Charles Webster Leadbeater, who had arrived in Adyar in 1909.

Wood observed Leadbeater's discovery of the boy Jiddu Krishnamurti, who soon declared Krishnamurti the vehicle for the "coming World Teacher". Wood's account of this discovery is in his autobiography, Is this Theosophy...?, published in 1936, and in two articles written after that.

At Besant's suggestion, Wood became involved in education, and after 1910, he served as headmaster of several schools and colleges founded by the Theosophical Society. Wood became Professor of Physics, Principal and President of the Sind National College and the Madanapalle College, both teaching colleges of the Bombay and Madras Universities. Wood promoted theosophical ideas, conducting lecture tours and publishing numerous articles, essays, and books on a variety of theosophical subjects, including a digest of Helena P. Blavatsky's Secret Doctrine. He lectured throughout India and travelled to many countries in Asia, Europe, and the Americas, where he met the spiritual teacher Meher Baba aboard the ship Conte Rosso in April 1932. He continued to reside in India until the close of World War II, when he relocated to the United States.

Wood became disillusioned with the future of the Theosophical Society and began studying the yoga classics. After the Krishnamurti affair, which caused a split in the society, Wood campaigned for election as president after Annie Besant's death in 1933. He lost to George Arundale, one of Charles Leadbeater's close allies, in a campaign Wood later described as unfair and questionable. Disenchanted with the society's direction, but impressed with the now mature and independent Krishnamurti, Wood turned to Yoga.

== Yoga ==
In India, Wood had encountered many yogis and Hindu pundits. As a practising yogi, vegetarian and teetotaller, having adopted this lifestyle after reading Sir Edwin Arnold's The Light of Asia in his boyhood, he was warmly received by Indian yogis, many of whom became Wood's friends and advisers. Ernest also practiced celibacy throughout his life and would have no children. During his early years in Adyar, the Head of the Vedantic Monastery Shri Shringeri Shivaganga Samasthanam in Mysore Province, Sri Jagat Guru Shankara Charya Swami, bestowed upon Wood the title of "Shri Sattwikagraganya" in recognition of his efforts to introduce Indian pupils to Sanskrit.

Wood did not officially become a student of any Indian master. However, during a visit to New York in 1928(?), he again met with Krishnamurti, who was leaving the Theosophical Society to become an independent teacher, renouncing the ceremonies and occult hierarchies created by the leadership of the society. This meeting affected Wood deeply, and he returned to the classic yoga literature as a source of inspiration. It was also about this time when Wood exposed an Indian woman who claimed to be a witch and did not need to eat. She held sway over people in a small village, and poisoned Wood as an act of revenge for his exposure of her. Ernest almost died, and could eat little solid food for the rest of his life following the poisoning. Wood spent his remaining years writing and publishing on yoga. He moved to the United States, where he served for a short time as president and dean of the American Academy of Asian Studies in San Francisco, and later moved to Houston, Texas, working for the University of Houston.

Shortly after his arrival in India, Wood had begun translating the Indian classics, such as the Garuda Purana. In the late 1920s, he began a thorough study of the Yoga classics with the assistance of several Hindu scholars, leading to the publication of numerous translations of famous yoga texts such as the Bhagavad Gita, Patañjali's Yoga Sutras, Shankara's Viveka Chudamani. In his commentaries to these translations, Wood tried to make these texts' philosophical ideas applicable to modern life. His writings contain many references to his own practical experiences in these matters. Together with his concise treatises of yoga, such as the volume Yoga, Penguin Books, 1959/62, and his earlier writings on concentration and memory training, Wood's works contain a complete introduction to the classic texts of Raja Yoga, or the yoga of the mind, with a sparing use of Sanskrit expressions.

== Later life ==
During their years in India, Ernest Wood and his wife Hilda had become familiar with the pioneering educational work of Dr. Maria Montessori. In 1939, Maria Montessori was persona non grata with the fascist government of Mussolini for refusing to do its bidding. The Theosophical Society extended an invitation to her to come to Adyar, India. She accepted it and lived there from 1939 to 1948, During those years, many Montessori schools were founded in India. Hilda, Ernest and Maria Montessori were vital forces in their founding. It is reasonable to assume that, being in the same vicinity and working toward the same goals for some seven years, there must have been considerable interaction among the three.

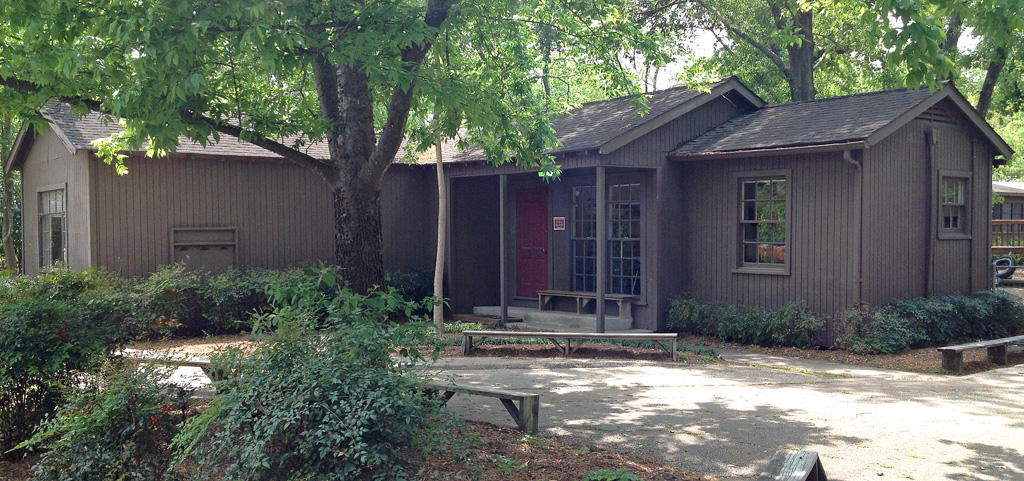
This peaceful cottage on Wirt Road in the Spring Branch District of Houston, Texas was the home of Ernest and Hilda Wood during their final years. The cottage and surrounding two acres was acquired in the 1970s by School of the Woods which they founded in 1962. It served for almost two decades as an early childhood classroom. As shown above on 1 April 2013, it has been repurposed to house the Advancement Office of School of the Woods. It is a working memorial to the contributions of Ernest and Hilda.

Ernest and Hilda made their home in Houston, Texas in the late 1950s where they became active in the Unitarian Fellowship of Houston in 1959. "Hilda focused on developing a Fellowship library and began talking about establishing a Montessori school – Ernest was frequently asked to deliver inspirational talks." They successfully opened the Montessori school in the Fall of 1962 with a student body of children of mostly Unitarian parents. Hilda and Ernest ordered all the Montessori materials and Maria Montessori's writings from England and India – none existed in the US in 1962. Ernest Wood was president of the school's first Board of Trustees.

The couple took up residence in a small cottage adjacent to the Fellowship property on Wirt Road in the Spring Branch district of Houston. They nurtured the school until Ernest's death in 1965 and Hilda's in 1968. The board of trustees decided to name School of the Woods after its founders.

Wood died on 17 September 1965, days after finishing his translation of Shankara's Viveka Chudamani, which was posthumously published and entitled The pinnacle of Indian thought.

== Works ==
- The Garuda Purana (Saroddhara). The Sacred Books of the Hindus, Vol. 9. Indian Press 1911.
- The Seven Rays. 1925.
- The Intuition of the Will. The Theosophical Press 1927. ISBN 0-7661-9095-1
- An Englishman Defends Mother India. A Complete Constructive Reply to "Mother India", Ganesh & Co. 1929, revised 1930.
- The Occult Training of the Hindus, 1931 (republished in 1976 under the title Seven Schools of Yoga by the Theosophical Publishing House).
- The Song of Praise to the Dancing Shiva. Ganesh & Co. 1931.
- Mind and Memory Training. Theosophical Publishing House 1936.
- Is this Theosophy...? (Autobiography) Rider & Co. 1936. ISBN 0-7661-0829-5
- Practical Yoga, Ancient and Modern, with an Introduction by Paul Brunton. E.P. Dutton & Co., Inc. 1948.
- Concentration – An Approach to Meditation. Theosophical Publishing House 1949. ISBN 0-8356-0176-5
- The Glorius Presence, A Study of the Vedanta Philosophy and Its Relation to Modern Thought, Including a New Translation of Shankara's Ode to the South-Facing Form. Rider & Co. 1952.
- Great Systems of Yoga. Philosophical Library 1954.
- The Bhagavad Gita Explained, With a New and Literal Translation. New Century Foundation Press 1954.
- Yoga Dictionary. Philosophical Library 1956.
- Zen Dictionary. Philosophical Library 1957. ISBN 0-14-021998-6
- Yoga. Penguin Books 1959. Revised 1962.
- A Study of Pleasure and Pain. The Theosophical Press 1962.
- Vedanta Dictionary. Philosophical Library 1964.
- The Pinnacle of Indian Thought, Being a new, independent translation of the Viveka Chudamani (Crest Jewel of Discrimination) with commentaries. The Theosophical Publishing House, 1967.
- Perfeccionamiento de si mismo. Traducido del inglés por Federico Climen Terrer. Editorial Kier 1955. (en castellano)
- Come Unto Me and Other Writings. The Theosophical Publishing House 2000.
