= DuPage County Historical Museum =

- Adams Memorial Library
- U.S. National Register of Historic Places
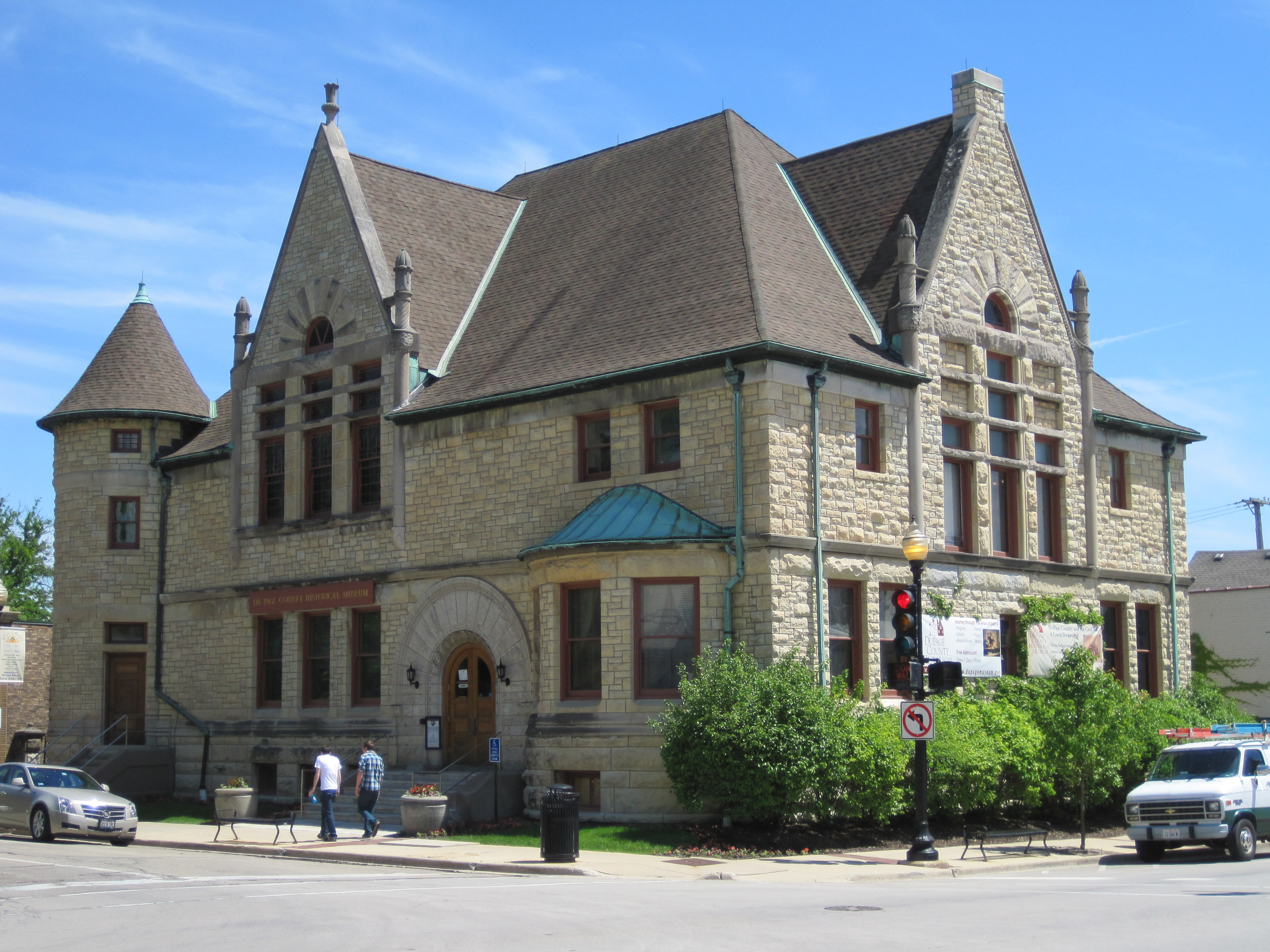
- DuPage County Historical Museum in 2011

- Location within Illinois Location within the United States
- Location: 102 East Wesley Street; Wheaton, DuPage County, Illinois, U.S.
- Coordinates: 41°51′57.5″N 88°6′23″W
- Built: 1891; 135 years ago
- Architect: Charles Sumner Frost
- Architectural style: Romanesque Revival
- NRHP reference No.: 81000675
- Added to NRHP: June 4, 1981

The DuPage County Historical Museum, formerly the Adams Memorial Library, is a building designed by Charles Sumner Frost in Wheaton, Illinois, United States.

== History ==
Adams Memorial Library was the first public library in Wheaton, Illinois; along with a library in Downers Grove, it was one of the first two libraries in the county. Funds for its completions were donated by John Quincey Adams, a real estate investor and miller. Adams was born in Hopkinton, Massachusetts and moved to Chicago in 1851. He was the fourth cousin, twice removed of President John Quincy Adams. He co-founded the Chicago Board of Trade and became a prominent Chicago citizen. Adams moved to Wheaton following the death of his wife, Marilla Phipps Adams, for whom the library was named. Charles Sumner Frost, who had recently designed the Chicago and North Western railroad station in Wheaton, was selected as the architect. It was one of Frost's first commission after he split with partner Henry Ives Cobb. Ground was broken on October 2, 1890 and Adams dedicated the museum on October 28, 1891. The library classified books with the Dewey Decimal system, becoming one of the first in Illinois to use this system. Adams Memorial was the main library in the region until a new library was constructed in 1965. The endowment from Adams completely supported the facility until 1923, when Wheaton provided additional funds. The initial book purchase by Adams exceeded 2,700 books.

The DuPage County Historical Society purchased the Adams Memorial building in 1965 and transferred ownership to the county. It re-opened as the DuPage County Historical Museum in 1967. On June 4, 1981, it was recognized by the National Park Service with a listing on the National Register of Historic Places. The museum seeks to "educate the general public through the collection, preservation, interpretation, and exhibition of materials which document the history of DuPage County and its relationship to Illinois and the nation, and to provide local history services for historical organizations and for scholarly endeavors."

== Architecture ==
The building is found at the southeast corner of Wesley and Main Streets in Wheaton. It stands two stories tall and was built with coursed limestone and Bedford stone trimmings in the Richardsonian Romanesque style. The style is characterized by rough-hewn stone blocks, emphasized horizontal lines, wide rounded arches, and intricate ornamentation. The work is nearly identical to a library that Frost designed in Morgan Park, Chicago the previous year. Each facade has a tall stone gable with pinnacles on either side near the base. Gable eaves have dentil moldings carved into a leaf motif. Each gable has an arched window. The north gable is capped with a decorative urn. The north facade features a turreted stair tower on the east side. It also has a double doorway, the main entrance, and a bay window on the west side of the first floor. The entrance is arched with a Bedford stone egg-and-dart voussoir. An inner arch is ornamented with a leaf design. The south facade has a bay window that looks out onto a small courtyard.

The interior features oak floors and plaster ceilings. The first floor is dominated by a main hall with an oak staircase on the west wall. The main reading room is on the northwest corner, the ladies' reading room is on the southwest, a lecture hall is on the northeast, and three rooms are on the southeast. The main hall features marble wainscoting. The main reading room has a carved panel ceiling and a fireplace; this room features the north bay window. The ladies reading room also has a fireplace. The lecture room is decorated with oak wainscoting. The library room, one of the three southeast rooms, also originally had a fireplace. The second floor was a 500-seat auditorium with a gallery. A room on the southeast of the floor was used as a dressing room, though it was later removed to build a fire escape and kitchen. The staircase leads up to a third floor, which originally overlooked the auditorium.

In celebration of the 2018 Illinois Bicentennial, DuPage County Historical Museum was selected as one of the Illinois 200 Great Places by the American Institute of Architects Illinois component (AIA Illinois).
