= Association Montessori Internationale =

Danish nongovernmental organization

- Founded: August 1929; 97 years ago Denmark
- Founder: Maria Montessori
- Type: Non-profit; International NGO
- Headquarters: Amsterdam, Netherlands
- Location: Global
- Services: Montessori training and administration
- Fields: Education from birth to adulthood
- Members: 5,200
- President: Alain Tschudin
- Executive Director: Lynne Lawrence
- Website: montessori-ami.org

Association Montessori Internationale (AMI) is an Amsterdam-based global non-governmental organization dedicated to Montessori education.

== Objectives ==
AMI was constituted in 1929, by Maria Montessori, to maintain and develop her pedagogy with the purpose of making it available to as many children as possible worldwide. The AMI Scientific Pedagogy Group determine the nature of Montessori educational materials in use worldwide and AMI maintains legal contracts with authorised manufacturers; Nienhuis in the Netherlands, Gonzagarredi in Italy, Matsumoto in Japan and Agaworld in South Korea.

== History ==
The Association Montessori Internationale is the sole Montessori organisation founded by Montessori herself. It was founded in August 1929 by Maria and her son Mario in Helsingør, Denmark during a period in which they were enduring increasing hostility with the rise of fascism in Germany, Italy and Spain. In 1936 Montessori relocated her family from Barcelona, where they had lived since 1917, to Laren, The Netherlands and the AMI office to premises in Michelangelostraat, Amsterdam.

At the outbreak of World War II Montessori was on a lecture tour of India with her son Mario and as Italian citizens were held under house arrest and internment respectively until the end of the war. Ada Pierson, Mario's wife to be, maintained AMI in Amsterdam during the war years until the return of Maria and Mario in 1946. Just prior to her return to Amsterdam in 1946 the house at 161 Koninginneweg was purchased for her as her home and as an office for AMI. Her study in the building survives as a small museum. During the post-war period Maria Montessori was particularly active in helping in the establishment of UNESCO and immediately following her return to Europe she addressed the newly constituted organisation on the subject of 'Education and Peace'. Her last congress speeches were delivered London in 1951 when she attended the 9th AMI International Montessori Congress.

On 6 May 1952, Montessori died, bequeathing her legacy in AMI to her son Mario. AMI was subsequently registered by Dutch Royal Decree in the Netherlands on 24 January 1954 as Internationale Montessori Vereniging (Association Montessori Internationale).

Mario Montessori maintained his position of General Director of AMI after Maria's death in 1952 until he died in 1982. Ada Montessori Pierson succeeded him and took on the role of AMI General Secretary until her death in 1988, after which Fahmida Malik took on that role within the organisation.

During his period as AMI General Director Mario Montessori appointed Nancy McCormick Rambusch in 1958 to represent AMI in the USA. Rambusch went on to found the American Montessori Society in September 1960.

In 1973, on the 75th birthday of Mario Montessori, the Mario Montessori 75 Fund (MM75 Fund), was established as a non-profit foundation in his honour with the purpose of assisting the funding of professional training in Montessori education. The fund is administered by AMI.

== Structure ==
AMI remains headquartered in Amsterdam at 161-163 Koninginneweg in the building purchased for Maria Montessori and an adjacent building purchased for expansion in 2010. AMI maintains a membership of over 5,000 individuals and it has now grown to encompass a global network of 48 legal affiliates in 42 countries including its USA Affiliated Office Association Montessori International of the United States which was established as a US 501(c)(3) not-for-profit organisation in 1972 by Mario Montessori, Richard Salzmann and Albert L. Ledgard Jr. In addition, AMI affiliated Montessori societies are found in Argentina, Armenia, Belarus, Bulgaria, Canada, Chile, China, Colombia, Czech Republic, Egypt, Finland, France, Germany, India, Ireland, Italy, Ivory Coast, Japan, Kazakhstan, Kenya, Latvia, Lebanon, Mexico, Mongolia, Morocco, Nigeria, Norway, Pakistan, Peru, Romania, Russia, Serbia, Spain, Sweden, Switzerland, Thailand, Ukraine, United Arab Emirates, United Kingdom.

AMI has 64 teacher training centres in 32 countries around the world and it incorporates a global outreach division Educateurs sans Frontières,

Educateurs sans Frontières, also known as EsF, was inspired by Montessori's 1917 initiative during World War I to create a 'White Cross' (an educational equivalent of the Red Cross). These aspirations were incorporated into the work of AMI by Montessori's granddaughter, Renilde Montessori, as 'Educateurs sans Frontières' which acted as a division of AMI, whilst Renilde was AMI General Secretary. EsF supports initiatives with underserved populations in an expanding number of countries.

Various other programmes and resources include Aid to Life, EsF for Children's Rights, Montessori Dementia, Montessori Digital, Montessori150 and Montessori Architecture.

AMI is associated with the United Nations Department of Public Information and is admitted in partnership at UNESCO. Maria Montessori was instrumental in the founding of UNESCO and Jaime Torres Bodet held a UNESCO reception in her honour on 7 December 1949. AMI is a supporter of the Montessori Model United Nations.

== International Montessori Congress ==
Every four years AMI holds an International Congress. The 9th Congress in London, United Kingdom in 1951 was Montessori's last public engagement before she died. More recently, the 28th International Congress, was held in Prague, Czech Republic from 27–30 July 2017 with an attendance of 1,800. The 28th Congress was supported by 17 Montessori associations. The 29th International Montessori Congress in Bangkok, Thailand took place on 2-5 August 2023 and was opened by Princess Sirindhorn of Thailand, the Princess Royal. The 30th International Montessori Congress, themed "Joyful Journey", was held in Mérida, Yucatán, Mexico, from 1 to 4 May 2026, with more than 2,000 participants.
