= Association Montessori International of the United States =

National non-profitable organization

Association Montessori International/USA
- Nickname: AMI/USA
- Formation: 1972; 54 years ago
- Type: Nonprofit, NGO
- Purpose: Education administration
- Headquarters: 206 N. Washington, Ste 330, Alexandria, VA
- Coordinates: 38°48′17″N 77°02′37″W
- Region served: United States
- Services: Accreditation of: Montessori schools; Montessori teacher training
- Members: 17,000
- Executive Director: Dr. KaLinda Bass-Barlow
- Affiliations: Association Montessori Internationale
- Website: amiusa.org

The Association Montessori International/USA (AMI/USA) is a national non-profit organization that strives to propagate and further the teachings and work of Dr. Maria Montessori in the United States. As an affiliate of the Association Montessori Internationale, the Association Montessori International/USA oversees recognition of eligible Montessori schools, supports AMI Montessori teacher training centers, and organizes professional development opportunities in the United States. The organization also maintains a member database of about 17,000 teachers, school administrators, parents, and interested individuals.

== History ==
The Association Montessori Internationale (AMI) is the oldest Montessori organization in the world, established by Maria Montessori in 1929, with its headquarters in Amsterdam, the Netherlands. The AMI was founded to maintain the integrity of the life work of Maria Montessori and to ensure that it would be perpetuated after her death. Montessori's son and personal assistant, Mario, was given the task of safeguarding the Montessori movement after her death.

=== In the United States ===
Mario Montessori sent Margaret Elizabeth Stephenson to the United States in 1961. Trained by Maria Montessori, Stephenson operated initially as Montessori's personal representative in the United States. As the movement grew, Stephenson was granted approval to establish a branch office of AMI in the United States. AMI/USA was founded in 1972 and directed for its first ten years by Karin Salzmann. In 1988, Virginia McHugh succeeded Jon Osterkorn as Executive Director of AMI/USA. As of January 2026, Dr. KaLinda Bass-Barlow was the Executive Director.

Today there are over 200 AMI schools across the United States. The AMI recognition program was initiated to assist families in assessing whether schools are following Montessori principles and practices in their original integrity and completeness. The AMI standards maintain the level of excellence that Montessori envisioned and were developed by the AMI Scientific Pedagogy Group for this purpose. These standards ensure that children are provided the opportunity for full intellectual, social, and psychological growth and that the approach is consistent with what is presented in AMI training courses worldwide. It is upon these standards that AMI recognition status is granted by level within the school, each year.

During the past twenty years the amount of scientific research confirming the Montessori method has increased: "Maria Montessori, through observation of children, developed materials that engage both the hands and the mind of the child. Science and research, especially in the past twenty years, have come to prove that Montessori's observations accurately describe the learning needs of children and have shown as well that the principles Dr. Montessori envisioned do create joyful learners."

== Mission ==
The Association Montessori International of the United States (AMI/USA) is dedicated to bringing the principles of Dr. Maria Montessori to the education of children through its support and advancement of the AMI Montessori community in the United States. AMI/USA collaborates with affiliates such as the AMI Elementary Alumni Association (AMI-EAA) and the North American Montessori Teachers' Association (NAMTA).

== Programs ==
School Recognition Program

A certificate of recognition is granted to a subset of Montessori schools who prove that they meet a set of specific Montessori standards as derived from Maria Montessori’s original research and methodology. Programs must apply annually for one of the following levels: recognized, affiliated, or associated.

Professional Development

AMI/USA facilitates conferences each year. The annual refresher course and workshops cater to all AMI trained professionals, as well as classroom assistants, administrators, and, beginning in 2009, parents. Additionally, in fall and spring, AMI/USA sponsors a regional conferences.

Membership

AMI/USA facilitates membership benefits to AMI members living in the United States. Membership to AMI through AMI/USA is offered on an individual basis; schools and institutions are not eligible for AMI membership. Membership benefits include a yearly subscription to AMI and AMI/USA publications, including the quarterly AMI/USA newsletter AMI/USA News and the bi-annual AMI scholarly journal Communications. Members also receive a preferred rate on AMI/USA publications, and receive a discount from AMI approved Montessori materials distributors.

Teacher Training Program

AMI/USA works in partnership with AMI Montessori training centers to help ensure the caliber of AMI teacher training is maintained in the United States. "The standards of Montessori practice were originally delineated by the Association Montessori International (AMI) in 1929. They represent an integrated body of materials, methodology, psychology, and philosophy that provides Montessori teachers with a common reference point."

We Are Montessori

AMI/USA also coordinates the "We Are Montessori" project, which has the objective of "celebrating Montessori alumni and bringing awareness to the benefits of Montessori education." The initiative collects information to showcase alumni they consider as successful, and the schools that fostered their education. To date, AMI/USA it is the only organization systematically collecting information on Montessori alumni in the United States.

== AMI Teacher Training Centers ==
Location/State	Name	Established	Website
Addison, TX	Montessori Institute of North Texas	2004	montessori-mint.org
Atlanta, GA	Montessori Institute of Atlanta	1968	montessori-mia.org
Baltimore, MD	Washington Montessori Institute at Loyola University Maryland		loyola.edu/school-education/academics/graduate/montessori/
Bloomfield, CT	Montessori Training Center North East	2003	mtcne.org
Carmichael, CA	Montessori Training Center	1979	montessoritrainingcenter.com
Denver, CO	The Montessori Institute	1988	tmidenver.com
Milwaukee, WI (including Kansas City)	Montessori Institute of Milwaukee at Alverno College		montessorimilwaukee.org
Painesville, OH	Hershey Montessori Institute at Lake Erie College		lec.edu/montessori
Portland, OR	Montessori Northwest	1979	montessori-nw.org
San Diego, CA (including Miami, FL)	Montessori Institute of San Diego		misdami.org
St. Louis, MO	Montessori Training Center of St. Louis	1972	mtcstl.org
Saint Paul, MN	Montessori Center of Minnesota	1973	montessoricentermn.org

== See also ==
- Montessori in the United States
