= American Montessori Society =

American educational membership organization

- Abbreviation: AMS
- Formation: September 1960; 65 years ago
- Type: Non-governmental organization
- Headquarters: New York City, New York
- Executive director: Munir Shivji
- Website: amshq.org

The American Montessori Society (AMS) is a New York City-based, member-supported nonprofit organization which promotes the use of the Montessori teaching approach in private and public schools.

AMS advocates for the Montessori method (popularized by Maria Montessori) throughout the United States, and publishes its own standards and criteria for its accredited member schools. AMS supports research and public policy that advocate for Montessori education.

== History ==
=== Founder ===
In the 1950s, the cultural climate around American education was changing as people become discontent with the status quo. Among those seeking alternatives was Nancy McCormick Rambusch, a young teacher from New York City.

In 1953, Rambusch's quest for a better approach to educating American children took her to Paris, France for the Tenth International Montessori Congress, where she met Mario Montessori, Maria Montessori's son. Mario worked in the movement, as head of the Association Montessori Internationale (AMI), an organization she had founded to support the movement.

Mario urged Rambusch to take coursework in Montessori education and to bring the Montessori method to the United States.

Within a few years, Rambusch was conducting Montessori classes for her own children and others, in her New York City apartment. In 1956, the Rambusch family moved to Greenwich, Connecticut. There, Rambusch became involved with a group of parents who wanted to be involved with their children's education. In 1958, they founded Whitby School—the first Montessori school to open in the United States since the initial flurry of interest in the early 20th century. The board selected Rambusch as head of school.

Rambusch was appointed the American representative of the Association Montessori Internationale by Mario Montessori. Six months later, Rambusch founded the American Montessori Society.

=== Beginnings ===
The goals of AMS mirrored those of AMI: to support efforts to create schools, develop teacher education programs, and publicize the value of Montessori education.

In 1961, Time magazine featured Rambusch, Whitby School, and the American Montessori revival in its May 12 issue. Parents turned to AMS for advice on starting schools and study groups. Additional publicity in the media, including Newsweek, the New York Times, and the Saturday Evening Post, as well as the publication in 1962 of Rambusch's book, Learning How to Learn, led to growth in the number of American Montessori schools and students.

From the beginning, Rambusch and AMS worked to advance Montessori education into mid-20th-century American culture. AMS insisted that all teacher educators have a college degree so that the coursework could, potentially, be recognized by state education departments. AMS also broadened the curriculum for teachers and sought to connect with mainstream education by offering Montessori coursework in traditional teacher preparation programs.

Rambusch believed there was a need for cultural accommodation. Professor John J. McDermott, a colleague and friend, agreed, arguing that the popular idea of the universality of children displayed a basic naiveté about the interrelationships between a culture and the child's development of consciousness. McDermott also stressed the need to move Montessori into the public sector so that it would be available to all children, regardless of their circumstances—a conviction that remains a vital underpinning of the organization, along with a belief in the need for adaptability.

=== Archives ===
The American Montessori Society Archives are housed at the Thomas J. Dodd Research Center at the University of Connecticut in Storrs, Connecticut. The multi-media collection reflects the activities of the AMS going back to its earliest days, and also provides historical information about Montessori education.

== Affiliated teacher education programs ==
Teacher education programs affiliated with the American Montessori Society provide courses for people who want to be Montessori teachers.

== Use of Montessori terminology ==
In 1967, the US Patent Trademark Trial and Appeal Board ruled that "the term 'Montessori' has a generic and/or descriptive significance." Therefore, in the United States and around the world, the term can be used freely without giving any guarantee of how closely, if at all, a program applies Montessori's work. The ruling has led to "tremendous variation in schools claiming to use Maria Montessori's methods."

== See also ==
- Montessori in the United States
- Association Montessori International of the United States
- Maria Montessori
- Montessori education
