= List of Montessori schools =

This is a list of Montessori schools that follow the principles of Montessori education according to Maria Montessori, as accredited by the Association Montessori Internationale or its affiliated organizations. Notable AMI-endorsed Montessori schools include:

== Australia ==
Location	Name	Established	Notes
Sydney, NSW	Inner Sydney Montessori School		
Sydney, NSW	Sydney Montessori School		
Merrimac, Gold Coast, QLD	Queensland Independent College		
Beechworth, VIC	Beechworth Secondary College		
Perth, WA	Perth Montessori School		

== Canada ==
Location	Name	Established	Notes
Surrey, BC	Mountainview Montessori School		
Hamilton, ON	Hillfield Strathallan College	1901	
Markham, ON	Town Centre Private Schools (Note: Montessori offered in pre-school only.)	1986	
Toronto, ON	Toronto Montessori Schools		
York, ON	York Montessori School	2007	

== China ==
Location	Name	Established	Notes
Qingdao	Qingdao Amerasia International School	2011	
North Point, Hong Kong SAR	Island Children's Montessori School		

== Colombia ==
Location	Name	Established	Notes
Bogotá	Gimnasio Moderno	1914	

== Eritrea ==
Location	Name	Established	Notes
Asmara	Istituto Italiano Statale Omnicomprensivo di Asmara	2020	

== Germany ==
Location	Name	Established	Notes
Potsdam, Brandenburg	Montessori Oberschule Potsdam		
Frankfurt am Main, Hesse	Anna-Schmidt-Schule		
Friedrichsdorf, Hesse	Rhein-Main International Montessori School		

== India ==
Location	Name	Established	Notes
Bengaluru, Karnataka	Ekya Schools		
Chennai, Tamil Nadu	Lady Andal	1987	
Chennai, Tamil Nadu	Siragu Montessori School	2003	
Madurai, Tamil Nadu	Mahatma Montessori Matriculation Higher Secondary School		
Tiruchchirapalli, Tamil Nadu			
Lucknow, Uttar Pradesh	City Montessori School		

== Ireland ==
Location	Name	Established	Notes
Dublin	Children's House Montessori School		

== Japan ==
Location	Name	Established	Notes
Tokyo	Seisen International School	1949	

== Jordan ==
Location	Name	Established	Notes
Amman	Modern Montessori School		

== The Maldives ==
Location	Name	Established	Notes
Malé	Iskandhar School	1961	

== The Netherlands ==
Location	Name	Established	Notes
Amsterdam	6th Montessori School Anne Frank	1933	
Amsterdam	Montessori Lyceum Amsterdam	1930 (Note: The first Montessori school in the world.)	

== Nigeria ==
Location	Name	Established	Notes
Rivers State	Bereton Montessori Nursery and Primary School	1978	
Lagos	First Island Montessori School		

== The Philippines ==
Location	Name	Established	Notes
Tanza, Cavite	De Roman Montessori School		
Silang, Cavite	La Belle Montessori School		
Tumauini, Isabela	Advance Montessori Education Center of Isabela, Inc.		
Taguig, Metro Manila	Anne-Claire Montessori School		
Valenzuela, Metro Manila	Sto. Rosario Montessori School		
San Leonardo, Nueva Ecija	Clever Lane Montessori School		
San Fernando, Pampanga	Southernside Montessori School		

== United Kingdom ==
Location	Name	Established	Notes
Oxford, England	Oxford Montessori Schools	1990	

== United States ==
Location	Name	Established	Notes
Mountain View, CA	Khan Lab School	2014	
Danbury, CT	Hudson Country Montessori School (Note: Dual campus in New Rochelle, NY.)	1995	
Greenwich, CT	Whitby School	1958	
Stamford, CT	The Children's School	1965	
Washington, D.C.	Latin American Montessori Bilingual Public Charter School	2001	
Washington, D.C.	Parkmont School	1972	
Wilmington, DE	Wilmington Montessori School	1964	
Hollywood, FL	Beachside Montessori Village		
Plantation, FL	Blake School		
Sandy Springs, GA	Springmont	1963	
Crest Hill, IL	Joliet Montessori School		
Louisville, KY	Montessori School of Louisville	2006	
Cambridge, MA	Cambridge Montessori School	1963	
Cambridge, MA	John M. Tobin Montessori School	1971	
Milton, MA	Thacher Montessori School	1971	
Chevy Chase and Kensington, MD	Oneness-Family School	1988	
Fort Washington, MD	Fort Washington Montessori School, a Beddow School	c. 1974	
Silver Spring, MD	Barrie School	1932	
Waldorf, MD	Waldorf Montessori School, a Beddow School		
Kalamazoo, MI	Northglade Montessori Magnet School	2001	
Midland, MI	Midland Montessori School	1971	
Chesterfield, MO	The Fulton School	1962	
Saint Paul, MN	Great River Charter Montessori School		
Charlotte, NC	J.T. Williams Secondary Montessori	2017	
Carlsbad, NM	Jefferson Montessori Academy	2002	
New Rochelle, NY	Hudson Country Montessori School (Note: Dual campus in Danbury, CT.)	1972	
New York City, NY	Caedmon School	1962	
Yonkers, NY	Yonkers Montessori Academy		
Cincinnati, OH	Clark Montessori High School	1994	
Cincinnati, OH	Gamble Montessori High School	2005	
Cincinnati, OH	The New School Montessori (Note: Located in the Richard H. Mitchell House.)		
Cleveland Heights, OH	Ruffing Montessori	1959	
Portland, OR	Franciscan Montessori Earth School & Saint Francis Academy		
Media, PA	The Walden School	1967	
Anderson, SC	Montessori School of Anderson	1973	
Louisville, TN	New Horizon Montessori School	1978	
Louisville, TN	Montessori Middle School	2008	
Austin, TX	Headwaters School	2002 (Note: Founded as Primavera Montessori.)	
Dallas, TX	Alcuin School	1964	
El Paso, TX	Montessori Learning Center	1999	
Houston, TX	Baker Montessori School	1925	
Houston, TX	School of the Woods	1962	
Houston, TX	St. Catherine's Montessori School	1966	
Milwaukee, WI	MacDowell Montessori School	2009	

== See also ==
- Montessori school (disambiguation)
- List of democratic schools
- List of Sudbury schools
- Lists of schools
