= ISM =

ISM or Ism may refer to:

== Arts and entertainment ==
- Incredible Shrinking Man, a film
- ISM (album), a 2012 album by Norwegian electronic music producer Savant
- Ism (film), a 2016 Indian Telugu-language action film starring Nandamuri Kalyan Ram
- Ism (band), an East Coast-based alternative rock quartet

== Organizations ==
- Institute for Supply Management, with headquarters in Arizona
- International Sports Management, English sports management company
- International Spy Museum, Washington, D.C.
- Independent Society of Musicians, (formerly Incorporated Society of Musicians) United Kingdom professional body
- Independent Sacramental Movement, section of Christianity
- International Society for Micropiles, concerned with micropile building techniques
- ISM Canada, an information technology service company based in Regina, Saskatchewan
- ISM Racing, a former autoracing team owned by Bob Hancher

=== Politics ===
- International Solidarity Movement, organization focused on assisting the Palestinian cause in the Israeli-Palestinian conflict
- Italian Social Movement, a former neo-fascist and post-fascist political party in Italy

=== Education ===
- Indian School of Mines, a Deemed University under the Section 3 of University Grants Commission Act, 1956
- Indian School, Muscat, a Central Board of Secondary Education-affiliated school in Oman
- International School of Management (Paris), an American graduate institution based in Paris and New York City
- ISM University of Management and Economics, an institution of management education based in Lithuania
- International School Moshi, Tanzania
- Illinois State Museum
- The International School of Minnesota, a private preparatory school
- Independence Seaport Museum, a maritime museum located in Philadelphia

== Science and technology ==
- ISM band, the industrial, scientific and medical radio bands
- Idiopathic sclerosing mesenteritis, disease of the small intestine
- Interstellar medium, in astronomy
- Implicit Shape Model, technique in computer vision
- InterSystems MUMPS, medical computer system
- .ism, a filename extension for InstallShield MSI projects

== Other uses ==
- Ism (name), the Arabic word for a personal name
- -ism, a suffix appended to many philosophical concepts
- Industry Structure Model, a formal model for skills and training, now superseded by SFIAPlus
- International Safety Management Code, used in shipping
- Kissimmee Gateway Airport (IATA airport code)
- Ian Standish Monteith Hamilton (1853–1947), British general
- Imperial Service Medal, decoration affiliated with the British Imperial Service Order
- Internationale Süßwarenmesse, confectionery fair held annually at Cologne trade fair
- International student ministry

== See also ==
- ISMS (disambiguation)
- Inner Sydney Montessori School, Australia
