= Aleksander Vinter discography =

Savant production discography
- Internet albums: 34
- Compilation albums: 1
- EPs: 20
- Singles: 206
- Music videos: 18
- Soundtracks: 6
- Mixtapes: 19
- Remixes: 45

Discography of the Norwegian electronic musician Aleksander Vinter.

Unknown dates are marked as (?), dates from third-party sources close to predicted dates are marked with a (?) alongside said date.

== Aliases ==
=== Savant ===
Main alias, active, electronic

==== Albums ====
Year	Name	Notes	Date
2011	Ninur		
2012	Vario		
2012	Overworld		
2012	ISM		
2012	Alchemist		
2013	Overkill	Collection of singles alongside some new tracks.	March 7
2013	Cult	Was released with 10 tracks, with four "Japan Bonus Tracks" added after release.	July 7
2013	Orakel		
2014	Protos		
2014	ZION		
2014	Invasion (Unmastered)	Released on Vinter's SoundCloud page but taken down later.	Late December (Singles dropped after ZION release)
2015	Invasion		
2016	Vybz		
2016	Outcasts	4-CD collection of old singles, IDs, and WIP/VIPs.	October 21
2017	The Black Room	Soundtrack for the movie The Black Room.	March 11
2017	Jester	Was remastered on 01.04.2018	April 17
2018	Slasher	Not to be confused with the Single of the same name. Original Soundtrack by Savant.	October 26
2019	Mortals	Original Soundtrack by Savant.	June 6
2020	Void		
2020	Insert Coin (OST)	Original Soundtrack by Savant.	December 16
2021	Void DLC		
2022	Krang		
2022	Alchemist 2	Remake of Alchemist	December 12

==== EPs ====
Year	Name	Date	Notes
2009	My First Dubstep	(?)	
2010	Thrillseekers	August 5	
2012	Mindmelt	June 24	Never officially released due to a hard drive crash.
2012	The Ritalin Project	July 17	Collaboration project with Donny Goines.
2013	♥ (Heart)	March 13	
2013	Four Days	May 6	Collab EP with AdamK and JELO created in 4 days while Savant was on tour staying with them.
2013	Thank You	September 16	Officially available through Savant: Complete as well as remade versions on Outcasts.
2024	HEX I	October 25	
2024	HEX II	November 22	

==== Singles ====
Year	Name	Date	Notes
(?)	Return	(?)	VIP WIP
(?)	Bluebloods - Back in the Days	(?)	Produced by Aleksander Vinter
(?)	Inflamer	(?)	Trashed Alchemist WIP. Later re-released on Throwback Mix.
(?)	Red Claw	(?)	VIP. Later re-released on Outcasts.
(?)	Cassette	(?)	8th VIP
(?)	Make You Dream	(?)	Alternative Edit/ WIP. Later re-released on Ninür.
(?)	Ocarine	(?)	WIP. Later re-released on Ninür.
(?)	Terror Bite	(?)	
(?)	Chop It	(?)	Featuring Gino Sydal. VIP.
(?)	Sunny California	(?)	WIP. Full version later released on Void.
2010	Follow Me	(?)	
2010	Outlaw (Part 1)	(?)	
2010	Aviatrix 2010	(?)	Russ track
2011	Retro	(?)	Russ track
2011	Cuba Libre	(?)	Russ track
2011	Stars & Stripes	(?)	Russ track
2011	Relations	(?)	Russ track. Snobe prod. Aleksander Vinter.
2011	Suburban	(?)	Russ track. Beck & Ruud prod. Savant.
2011	Airforce 11	(?)	Russ track. Marius Beck & 8-Tease feat. Aleksander Vinter.
2011	In the Kitchen	(?)	Russ track. Marius Beck feat. Aleksander Vinter.
2011	Yabba Dabba Doo	(?)	Russ track. Marius Beck feat. Aleksander Vinter.
2011	Operation Freedom	(?)	Russ track. Feat. Simon Aasen.
2011	16-Bit Lightsaber	(?)	Part of the V for Vinter Mixtape. Demo Tracks.
2011	Brute	(?)	Part of the V for Vinter Mixtape. Demo Tracks.
2011	Code	(?)	Part of the V for Vinter Mixtape. Demo Tracks.
2011	Hero	(?)	Part of the V for Vinter Mixtape. Demo Tracks.
2011	Kill You	(?)	Part of the V for Vinter Mixtape. Demo Tracks.
2011	Learn to Obrain	(?)	Part of the V for Vinter Mixtape. Demo Tracks.
2011	Maximus	(?)	Part of the V for Vinter Mixtape. Demo Tracks.
2011	Medicine	(?)	Part of the V for Vinter Mixtape. Demo Tracks.
2011	Crackpipe Dildo	(?)	Part of the V for Vinter Mixtape. Demo Track. Broken Glass Mix.
2011	Reaper	(?)	Part of the V for Vinter Mixtape. Demo Track. Later re-released on Throwback Mix.
2011	Bitchkiss	(?)	Part of the V for Vinter Mixtape.
2011	Door to a Room	(?)	Part of the V for Vinter Mixtape.
2011	Mushroom Clouds	(?)	Part of the V for Vinter Mixtape.
2011	Rocky X	(?)	Part of the V for Vinter Mixtape.
2011	Street Fighter	(?)	Part of the V for Vinter Mixtape.
2011	The Third Eye	(?)	Part of the V for Vinter Mixtape. Pre-Album Edit.
2011	Wanna be friends	(?)	Featuring Skrillex, Sebastian & Noisia. Part of the V for Vinter Mixtape.
2011	Welcome to Death	(?)	Part of the V for Vinter Mixtape. Later re-released on Throwback Mix.
2011	Bindie	(?)	Part of the V for Vinter Mixtape. Bonus Tracks.
2011	Misfit	(?)	Part of the V for Vinter Mixtape. Bonus Tracks.
2011	My Mouth	(?)	Part of the V for Vinter Mixtape. Bonus Tracks.
2011	UCANDO	(?)	Part of the V for Vinter Mixtape. Bonus Tracks.
2011	ICANDO	(?)	Part of the V for Vinter Mixtape. Bonus Track. Vinter claims that he made the whole track with only his mouth.
2011	Mastermind	(?)	WIP/First Version. Later re-released on Mindmelt EP.
2011	Are You	(?)	Feat. Twistex
2011	Indoctrination	(?)	
2011	Make Up Your Mind	(?)	
2011	Blue Magic	April 30	ft. Snobe
2011	Ninur	October 13	Later released as the title track of the album of the same name.
2011	Robosexual	November 16	Part of the V for Vinter Mixtape. Later re-released on Throwback Mix.
2011	Not Avicii	November 25	Part of the V for Vinter Mixtape.
2012	Lost	(?)	Russ tracks
2012	Avion	(?)	Russ tracks
2012	Expedition 2012	(?)	Russ tracks
2012	Paramnesia	(?)	Feat. Bluebloods & Russehit. Russ Track.
2012	Breathless	(?)	Featuring Twistex
2012	Dream Of You	(?)	With Twistex. Part of Twistex's Bassooka EP.
2012	Wreckless Driving	(?)	With Twistex.
2012	Good Times	(?)	
2012	Dishonored	(?)	
2012	Power Up	(?)	Unfinished / Prewiev. Later re-released on Outcasts.
2012	Prism Break	(?)	Unfinished / Prewiev.
2012	Rude Gal (Cupcake Nightmare)	(?)	Demo Version of Rude Gal
2012	OK Alright	(?)	Gino Sydal feat. Savant
2012	Government	(?)	
2012	Super Sheriff	(?)	
2012	Kids	(?)	
2012	I'obscurite	(?)	
2012	Its a Trap	(?)	Featuring Admiral Ackbar.
2012	Sines	(?)	Sins WIP. Part of the V for Vinter Mixtape.
2012	Rolling Stone	January 5	Part of the V for Vinter Mixtape.
2012	Alphas	February 2	Russ track. Part of the V for Vinter Mixtape.
2012	Mother Russia	February 12	
2012	License To Chill	April 13	Russ track. Axel Morris feat. Savant & Celina Svanberg.
2012	Psykick	May 17	Later re-released on Outcasts.
2012	Positive Vibes	May 18	Featuring Twistex
2012	Agape	May 19	Later re-released on Throwback Mix.
2012	Space Cowboy	June 23	
2012	Trevor	July 11	Vocals by Kiatzuki.
2012	Ksh'mir	August 1	
2012	Shake The Room	August 28	
2012	Ode To Joy	September 26	Later re-released on Outcasts at an 8.3% reduced speed and pitch.
2012	He Was A Moog	October 5	
2012	Vario 64	December 25	Later released as part of Overkill.
2012	Wade in the Water	December 28	
2012	Wildstyle	December 31	Later released as part of Overkill.
2013	Aces Sleeved	(?)	Later released as part of Overkill.
2013	1 Minute Sunday Techno	(?)	
2013	Mountain Of Death	(?)	
2013	Fy Farao	(?)	Russ Track. Feat. Twistex.
2013	Savant on Mushrooms	(?)	Part of Infected Mushroom's Friend On Mushrooms, Vol. 2
2013	Ratrace	(?)	Bluebloods prod. Savant.
2013	Future Trap	(?)	
2013	Wasteland	(?)	
2013	Ascent	(?)	Created as an intro track to his tribute video game, Savant Ascent.
2013	Memory	(?)	Later re-released on Outcasts.
2013	Zelda's Lullaby	(?)	
2013	Sweet	(?)	Later re-released on Jester.
2013	Ride the Beat	(?)	Feat. Wankaego
2013	Shark	January 7	Later released as part of Overkill.
2013	End of Intelligence	February 1	
2013	Light Years	February 21	Featuring Raizhell.
2013	Black Swan	April 5	Russ tracks.
2013	UNTZ	April 6	Russ tracks.
2013	The Arcade	April 19	Russ tracks.
2013	Carmageddon	April 26	Russ tracks.
2013	Pokermon	August 9	Created for episode 3 of season 2 of Video Game High School.
2013	Fatality	September 27	
2013	Vanity	October 27	
2014	Frozen Flames	(?)	Feat. Savant & Gino Sydal. Part of Twistex's Lume EP.
2014	Rise Up	(?)	Infected Mushroom Feat. Savant. Part of Infected Mushroom's Friends on Mushrooms Vol. 3.
2014	Amerika	January 6	
2014	Mellow	January 8	Vocals by Lucy Swann.
2014	Cloud Rider	January 15	
2014	Veritech	January 28	
2014	Rude Gal	January 30	
2014	Dragon Fire	March 14	With Virus Syndicate
2014	Elephant	March 26	
2014	Walk On Me	May 2	
2014	Derby	July 7	Featuring JELO.
2014	Mother Russia 2	July 15	
2014	Drop It On Ya!	August 3	With Gino Sydal
2014	Cult Collab	August 3	Collaboration song made entirely out of samples sent to Savant by his fans.
2014	Synesthesia	August 15	Part of the Bass for Autism dedicated to raise awareness for Autism.
2015	Fakers	(?)	String Arrangement / Orchestral VIP of Fakers from Protos.
2015	Unity	(?)	WIP
2015	Dimensions	(?)	WIP
2015	jeal·ous	(?)	
2015	Fraulein	(?)	
2015	Up In Smoke	April 23	Russ tracks.
2015	Up In Smoke (VIP)	April 23	Russ tracks.
2015	Moonriser	May 1	
2015	Furion	October 9	
2015	Slasher	October 29	Later added as a bonus track to the album of the same name.
2015	Origin (VIP)	December 11	
2015	I LOVE TECHNO	December 21	
2016	Fire	January 1	
2016	FlippKlipp Studio Theme	January 19	
2016	Cassette	January 24	Technically an album, consists of 7 tracks based on one song, all in different genres.
2016	Savior	March 4	
2016	Forsaken	April 8	
2016	F A B R I C S	May 10	
2016	H U S T L E R	May 11	
2016	Get It Get It	July 1	Featuring DMX and Snoop Dogg.
2017	The Videokid	(?)	Soundtrack for The Videokid game by PixelTrip Studios
2017	Surprise	March 13	Later added as a track on Jester, with different mastering and a new feature artist: Gaia.
2019	Keep Me Down	January 10	By Gaia, prod. and written by Savant
2019	Birds	March 14	By Gaia, prod. and written by Savant
2019	Monolith	September 25	Re-released on Void.
2019	Travis Scott - 90210	November 12	Vocal Cover by Gaia. Piano by Aleksander Vinter.
2020	Im Hot	March 17	Re-released on Void.
2020	Gaia - Lockdown	April 10	Prod. by Aleksander Vinter.
2021	Snake	January 4	Later re-released on Void DLC.
2022	Madness II	January 16	Re-released on Krang.
2022	Bloodthirst	January 23	Re-released on Krang.
2022	Punch	January 29	Re-released on Krang.
2023	Heat	June 2	with Omega Sparx, also released on Omega Sparx's album Overdrive on the same day
2023	Heart of a Fighter	June 2	with Omega Sparx and Marcus Munroe, also released on Omega Sparx's album Overdrive on the same day
2024	Smash	September 20	with Nika D
2024	Earworm	November 11	

==== Remixes ====
Year	Name	Date	Notes
2011	Document One - Clap	(?)	Part of the V for Vinter Mixtape.
2011	Blanco - Backdoor Access	(?)	Part of the V for Vinter Mixtape.
2011	Immortal - Tyrants	(?)	Part of the V for Vinter Mixtape.
2011	Savant feat. Vreid - Savant	(?)	Part of the V for Vinter Mixtape.
2011	Montée - Rendition of You	(?)	Part of the V for Vinter Mixtape. Later re-released on Throwback Mix.
2011	Savant - The Third Eye	(?)	Savants Poison Remix
2012	Kelis - Milkshake	(?)	
2012	Dev feat. Timbaland - Don't Hurt It	(?)	With Svanur
2012	P!INK - Get this party started	(?)	
2012	Zedd - Spectrum	(?)	
2012	Bob Log III - Log Bomb	(?)	
2012	Shackles - No Sleep	(?)	
2012	Blood Command - High Five For Life	(?)	Later re-released on Throwback Mix.
2012	Danger - 4h30	(?)	
2012	Pharoahe Monch - I shot the Mayor	(?)	
2012	Armand Van Helden - Into Your Eyes	(?)	
2012	Love Automatic - Nightmare	(?)	With Twistex
2013	Skepsis - Into Temptation	(?)	
2013	Justice - Audio Video Disco	(?)	Bootleg
2013	We Are Castor - Eskimo	(?)	
2013	Scatman John - Scatman	(?)	With Au5, Fractal and Prismatic.
2013	NEUS - Turn it Up	(?)	
2013	Swedish House Mafia - Don't You Worry Child	(?)	
2013	Snoop Dogg - Drop it like it's hot	(?)	
2013	Keane - Spralling	(?)	Bootleg
2013	Slipknot - Duality	(?)	Part of the Waffle Mix
2013	The White Stripes - Seven Nation Army	(?)	Part of the Waffle Mix
2015	Danny L Harle - In My Dreams	(?)	Bootleg.
2016	Kill the Noise & Feed Me - I Do Coke	(?)	Acoustic Cover
2017	Jonathan Geer - Owlboy Theme	November 1	

==== Mixtapes ====
Year	Name	Date	Notes
2011	V for Vinter	May 7	Contains the My First Dupstep EP, the Thrillseekers EP as well as a few Demo and Bonus Tracks, plus some Remixes and Free Tracks.
2011	New beats 'n' stuff	December 13	Mostly Vario demos.
2012	Beats 'n' stuff VOL 2	February 17	
2012	Random Beats Vol 1	June 4	
2012	secret stuff	August 21	AKA Bit Bandits.
2012	Random Demos	September 25	Mostly Alchemist demos.
2013	Archive Mix	April 25	
2013	Savant's 75 Minute Underground Hip-Hop Mixtape	December 2	Later re-uploaded to new SoundCloud account.
2014	Zombies Mixtape	January 4	
2014	Space Tour	April 1	
2014	Unfinished Business	May 17	
2014	Throwback Mix	August 27	
2014	Waffle Mix	August 29	
2015	Hip-Hop Mixtape vol. 2	March 3	
2015	Metal Mixtape	April 26	Contains tracks by Winterbliss, Megatron, Staal, and No Funeral.
2015	Ambient & Chillout Mixtape	May 26	
2015	DJ Set 2015	July 28	

=== Datakrash ===
Active, hip-hop

==== Albums ====
Year	Name	Date	Notes
2010	Beats Vol. 1	(?)	
2011	Beats Vol. 2	(?)	
2018	ToBy Season Vol. I	February 23	By ToBy, prod. Datakrash

==== EPs ====
Year	Name	Date	Notes
2017	Savage	May 5	Originally vinyl-exclusive; a digital version was released on November 1, 2017.
2018	90's Babies Datakrash Remixes	March 27	

==== Singles ====
Year	Name	Date	Notes
2011	Nybegynner	(?)	Prod. Datakrash.
2017	Night Watch	January 15	
2017	Atlantis	January 24	
2017	Special kind of Love	May 12	
2017	Overdrive	May 21	
2017	No	August 1	Edited version of track of same title on Savage EP.
2017	Seasons	August 20	
2017	Papercut	September 3	
2017	Feelin	September 10	
2017	Listen	September 20	
2017	Hype Mode	September 27	
2017	Slicker	November 23	
2017	Red Carpet	November 27	
2017	90's Babies	December 21	With ToBy, Later featured in the album ToBy Season Vol. I
2018	Show U Off	June 1	By ToBy, prod. by Datakrash
2018	OK//Wolf of the night	September 7	By ToBy, prod. by Datakrash
2018	Walk	September 15	By ToBy, prod. by Datakrash
2018	Preacher	September 21	By ToBy, prod. by Datakrash
2018	On My Own	September 28	By ToBy, prod. by Datakrash
2019	My Lane	January 28	By ToBy, prod. by Datakrash
2019	Back	April 7	By ToBy, prod. by Datakrash

==== Remixes ====
Year	Name	Date	Notes
2018	Rihanna - Work	April 10	Feat. Drake
2018	Migos - Bad and Boujee	April 11	Feat. Lil Uzi Vert
2018	Dr. Dre - Still D.R.E.	April 12	Feat. Snoop Dogg
2018	Future - Mask Off	April 13	
2018	Post Malone - Rockstar	April 14	Feat. 21 Savage

==== Mixtapes ====
Year	Name	Date	Notes
2017	Mood Mode	October 8	
2018	Anthology Part 1 - Boom Bap & Cadillacs	December 21	Includes various tracks from Beats Vol. 1 & 2 as well as Savant's 75 Minute Underground Hip-Hop Mixtape.

=== Vinter ===
Active, pop/RnB

==== Singles ====
Year	Name	Date	Notes
2017	Online	November 3	Produced by Datakrash.

=== Aleksander Vinter (self-alias) ===
Active, orchestral

==== Albums ====
Year	Name	Date	Notes
2010	Castle Repercussions	(?)	Soundtrack to the web-series Castle. Specifically the Castle Repercussions episodes.
2010	Nintendo Atmospheres	(?)	
2017	The Black Room	March 11	Soundtrack for the movie The Black Room. Listed here as well as under Savant due to an alias conflict. All official sources from Cleopatra records as well as news articles on the album state it as a Savant release, when Vinter himself has said it was made under Aleksander Vinter.
2018	Highlander	March 30	
2019	h o m e	November 14	1 Hour ambient music for working and relaxing
2019	a u r a	November 25	1 Hour ambient music for working and relaxing

==== EPs ====
Year	Name	Date	Notes
2009	Say Yes	(?)	
2010	D-Pad - ROFLGames	(?)	
2011	Antihero	(?)	
2011	Masquerade	(?)	

==== Singles ====
Year	Name	Date	Notes
(?)	Game Over	(?)	
(?)	Make Up Your Mind	(?)	
(?)	Minuette in A♯ minor	(?)	
(?)	Requiem in F minor	(?)	
(?)	Serenade in D minor	(?)	
(?)	Spring prelude in G major	(?)	
(?)	Devils Bolero in B Minor	(?)	
(?)	Suite of the Suffering in D Minor	(?)	
(?)	Symphony of lies	(?)	
(?)	Take Care Of You	(?)	
(?)	Catch Him	(?)	
(?)	Broken Bones	(?)	
(?)	Climax	(?)	Demo from an orchestral album.
(?)	War On God	(?)	
(?)	Breakable	(?)	
(?)	Back in Time	(?)	
(?)	Blekksprut Theme	(?)	
(?)	End of the World	(?)	
(?)	Fear & Wonder	(?)	
(?)	Hard Terrain	(?)	
(?)	Keep of Kalecin	(?)	
(?)	Killed by the Irony	(?)	
(?)	The Birth of Bliss	(?)	
(?)	The Sad Awakening	(?)	
(?)	The Seven Seas	(?)	
(?)	The Siege	(?)	
(?)	Vision Bleak	(?)	
(?)	Lowlander	(?)	Later re-released on Highlander.
(?)	Battlestations/The Corrupted	(?)	
2007	Perfect	(?)	
2007	Warriors	(?)	WIP
2007	Instant Nemesis	(?)	
2008	Crusade	(?)	
2008	Execution Rescue	(?)	
2008	Valentin	August 20	Fake movie theme.
2016	ISM (Suite)	September 11	Orchestral suite for ISM's 4th anniversary compiled of several melodies from the album.
2016	Menace	September 11	
2016	Phantom Voyage	September 11	
2016	Status Quo Adventure	September 12	
2016	Just a Piano	September 13	
2016	Modern Thrill	September 15	
2016	Sweet Dreams	September 15	
2016	Ghosts in Love	November 6	
2016	Waiting Theme	November 17	Re-released from Nintendo Atmospheres.
2016	A.I.	December 6	
2016	Masquerade: High Sea Theme	December 7	Re-release of Adventure from Masquerade.
2017	Lost in the Forest	April 21	
2017	War	July 30	
2017	Role Playing Atmosphere	September 1	
2017	Samba De Janerio	September 4	Orchestral Arrangement
2017	Mercy	November 18	
2018	Star Trek: The Next Generation	March 5	Piano Arrangement
2018	Fiddler	March 13	

==== Remixes ====
Year	Name	Date	Notes
2018	James Bond	March 5	

=== Blanco ===
Semi-active, electronic/reggae

==== Albums ====
Year	Name	Date	Notes
2018	Calypso	August 31	

==== EPs ====
Year	Name	Date	Notes
2010	The Mother Of God And A Filthy Whore	October 10	Also known as Latidos De Las Niñas
2015	Bajo	November 20	

==== Singles ====
Year	Name	Date	Notes	
(?)	Dyland - Bienvenidos Al Party	(?)	Produced by Blanco	
2015	Puerto Rico	August 9		
2015	Starfish (VIP)	September 10	Blanco remix of Savant - Starfish.	
2015	Carpe Diem	October 23	Featuring Turbulence.	Later released as part of Bajo.
2015	Camarilla	November 6	Featuring DYLAND.	Later released as part of Bajo.
2015	Bailamos	November 13	Featuring Eben Jr.	Later released as part of Bajo.
2018	Triad	August 17	Later re-released as part of Calypso	

==== Remixes ====
Year	Name	Date	Notes
2015	Wes - Alane	July 7	
2015	Turbulence - Notorious	August 7	Bootleg
2015	Noob & Brodinski - Peanuts Club	September 5	
2015	Chris Brown - Loyal	September 30	

==== Mixtapes ====
Year	Name	Date	Notes
2015	Salsa Verde DJ Set	November 13	

=== Spray & Play Games ===
Semi-active, chiptune

==== Albums ====
Year	Name	Date	Notes
2017	Retro Bundle	June 30	

=== Vinter In Hollywood ===
Inactive, pop/rock

==== Albums ====
Year	Name	Date	Notes
2009	Outbreak	May 8	
2009	Survival of the Fattest CD1: Bangers	(?)	
2009	Survival of the Fattest CD2: Destroy	(?)	
2009	Survival of the Fattest CD3: Ambience	(?)	
2009	Survival of the Fattest CD4: Disco	(?)	
2010	A House In Hollywood	(?)	
2011	Vinter In Hollywood	(?)	

==== EPs ====
Year	Name	Date	Notes
2009	Outbreak	May 7	Pre-release EP to his album of the same name.
2010	MASKS	November 27	

==== Singles ====
Year	Name	Date	Notes
(?)	Stalker	(?)	
(?)	Just a machine	(?)	
(?)	My Nightmare Adventures	(?)	
(?)	This Robot Thing	(?)	Untouched Mix.
(?)	Lemonade	(?)	Later re-released on Vinter in Hollywood.
(?)	Viva La Cassette	(?)	Later re-released on Vinter in Hollywood.
(?)	Run Away	(?)	
(?)	Pain Control	(?)	
(?)	Nuclear	(?)	
(?)	Wake Up	(?)	Reconstruction
(?)	Ghetto Freaks	(?)	
(?)	Restless	(?)	
2009	Virus	February 7 (?)	
2010	Ride Like The Wind	August 8	First song of his to pass 100k views on YouTube.
2010	You Can Play	December 3	
2011	Suppressor	February 10	
2011	Synthesizer Love	March 30	
2011	Gunslinger Jones	(?)	
2012	Take Care Of You	(?)	
2012	Symphony Of Lies	(?)	

==== Mixtapes ====
Year	Name	Date	Notes
2011	Blood and Happiness	(?)	Contains Beats Vol. 2, the Antihero EP, the Masquerade EP, the No Funeral Albums, the Shredder Album and the Album named Vinter in Hollywood.
(?)	Megamix	(?)	Contains 36 tracks.

==== Remixes ====
Year	Name	Date	Notes
(?)	Al Green - Love & Happiness	(?)	
(?)	Blood Command - Some Inches Away From Death	(?)	
(?)	Asia Today - I Love You	(?)	
(?)	Radiohead - Everything In Its Right Place	(?)	
(?)	Side Brok - E.g. Meina alt e.g. sei	(?)	
(?)	Daft Punk - Harder, Better, Faster, Stronger	(?)	Later re-released on A House in Hollywood.
(?)	Daft Punk - Superheroes	(?)	
(?)	Nrk - Store Studio	(?)	Bootleg
(?)	MaahesMa (/Stian Carlsen) - Maat	(?)	
(?)	Deepsky - Ghost	(?)	
(?)	Madonna Justin Timberlake - 4 Minutes	(?)	
(?)	The Prodigy - Smack my Bitch up	(?)	
(?)	Eric Prydz - Call on Me	(?)	
(?)	Timbaland ft. K. Hilson, D.O.E., Sebastian - The Way I Are	(?)	

=== Vinter In Vegas ===
Inactive, experimental/IDM

==== Albums ====
Year	Name	Date	Notes
2010	Mindfighting	October 10	
2011	Mamachine	June 16	

=== The Christopher Walkens ===
Inactive, rock (surf music)

==== EPs ====
Year	Name	Date	Notes
2010	Dead Surfers Club	October 10	
2012	Corn Fields	October 8	

=== Gunslinger Jones ===
Inactive, house (electronic)

==== Singles ====
Year	Name	Date	Notes
(?)	To The Beach	(?)	Featuring Twistex.
2011	Blue Magic	April 30	Featuring Snobe.

==== Remixes ====
Year	Name	Date	Notes
(?)	BT - Every Other Way	(?)	With Twistex

=== Megatron ===
Inactive, metal

==== Albums ====
Year	Name	Date	Notes
2008	Shredder	January 1	

==== Singles ====
Year	Name	Date	Notes
2008	All Hail Megatron	May 22	

=== Protos ===
Inactive, rock

==== EPs ====
Year	Name	Date	Notes
2009	Overworld	(?)	

==== Singles ====
Year	Name	Date	Notes
(?)	Aquarius	(?)	WIP Metal Edit
(?)	Firstborn	(?)	

=== Winterbliss ===
Inactive, rock

==== EPs ====
Year	Name	Date	Notes
2009	DragonFlower	January 1	

=== Morphine ===
Inactive, metal/noise

==== Singles ====
Year	Name	Date	Notes
(?)	My Abyss	(?)	
(?)	Anything Goes	(?)	
(?)	A Dirty Adventure	(?)	
(?)	The Adventures of Uncle Ruckus	(?)	
(?)	The Pirate Bay Anthem	(?)	
(?)	Back in Time	(?)	
2006	Man Of The Law	(?)	Hip-Hop Version.

==== Remixes ====
Year	Name	Date	Notes
(?)	Adraw - Faithful	(?)	
2005	4 Strings - Take Me Away (morphine remix)	(?)	Released on SectionZ

=== Numa ===
Inactive, techno

==== Singles ====
Year	Name	Date	Notes
(?)	King of the East	(?)	
2007	Amnesia	(?)	
2007	Remember	(?)	
2007	Costa Rica	(?)	
2007	Stripped 2007	(?)	

==== Remixes ====
Year	Name	Date	Notes
(?)	Dj Spoke - Hypnotic	(?)	

=== Starsheriffs ===
Inactive, pop/rock

==== Albums ====
Year	Name	Date	Notes
2006	The Starsheriffs	December 31	

==== Singles ====
Year	Name	Date	Notes

=== Metahouse ===
Inactive, ?

==== Singles ====
Year	Name	Date	Notes

=== Ninjaspliff ===
Inactive, Hip-Hop

==== Singles ====
Year	Name	Date	Notes
(?)	Sinister Minister Beat	(?)	
2008	Beats	August	

== Groups ==
=== No Funeral ===
Inactive, metal

==== Albums ====
Year	Name	Date	Notes
2006	Catacombe Royal	(?)	
2007	Engler Er Norske	(?)	
2008	Sort Industri Symfoni	(?)	

==== EPs ====
Year	Name	Date	Notes
2010	Blodtann	(?)	Demo.

==== Singles ====
Year	Name	Date	Notes
(?)	Kun en død	(?)	Later re-released on Engler er Norske.
(?)	Froströyk	(?)	Later re-released on Engler er Norske.
(?)	Adjø mine roser	(?)	Later re-released on Engler er Norske.
(?)	Blodskam Genotyp	(?)	Later re-released on Engler er Norske.
(?)	Gamle dager	(?)	Later re-released on Engler er Norske.
(?)	Det bleke intet [instrumental]	(?)	Later re-released non-instrumental on Sort Industri Symfoni.
(?)	En drøm	(?)	
(?)	Virusblod	(?)	

==== Remixes ====
Year	Name	Date	Notes
(?)	Morphine - War Cry	(?)	

=== Vega ¤ Vinter ===
Inactive, punk/jazz

==== Albums ====
Year	Name	Date	Notes
(?)	Vega x Vinter	2010	With Vega.

=== Twin World ===
Inactive, trance (electronic)

==== EPs ====
Year	Name	Date	Notes
2008	Hardware Heaven	January 1	

==== Remixes ====
Year	Name	Date	Notes
2006	Red3 [TSV Remix]	?	Released on SectionZ
2007	Supersound 07Metamix	?	Released on SectionZ

=== Staal ===
Inactive, metal

==== Albums ====
Year	Name	Date	Notes
2012	Rambokniv	March 16	

==== Singles ====
Year	Name	Date	Notes
?	Byggje ein mur	?	
?	Daudeblod	?	
?	Jeg lover	?	
?	Rambokniv	?	Later re-released as part of the album of the same name.
?	Speidargut	?	

== Overall ==
Year	Alias	Name	Date	Type	Notes
(?)	Aleksander Vinter	Game Over	(?)	Single	
(?)	Aleksander Vinter	Make Up Your Mind	(?)	Single	
(?)	Aleksander Vinter	Minuette in A♯ minor	(?)	Single	
(?)	Aleksander Vinter	Requiem in F minor	(?)	Single	
(?)	Aleksander Vinter	Serenade in D minor	(?)	Single	
(?)	Aleksander Vinter	Spring prelude in G major	(?)	Single	
(?)	Aleksander Vinter	Devils Bolero in B Minor	(?)	Single	
(?)	Aleksander Vinter	Suite of the Suffering in D Minor	(?)	Single	
(?)	Aleksander Vinter	Symphony of lies	(?)	Single	
(?)	Aleksander Vinter	Take Care Of You	(?)	Single	
(?)	Aleksander Vinter	Catch Him	(?)	Single	
(?)	Aleksander Vinter	Broken Bones	(?)	Single	
(?)	Aleksander Vinter	Climax	(?)	Single	Demo. From an orchestral Album.
(?)	Aleksander Vinter	War On God	(?)	Single	
(?)	Aleksander Vinter	Breakable	(?)	Single	
(?)	Aleksander Vinter	Back in Time	(?)	Single	
(?)	Aleksander Vinter	Blekksprut Theme	(?)	Single	
(?)	Aleksander Vinter	End of the World	(?)	Single	
(?)	Aleksander Vinter	Fear & Wonder	(?)	Single	
(?)	Aleksander Vinter	Hard Terrain	(?)	Single	
(?)	Aleksander Vinter	Keep of Kalecin	(?)	Single	
(?)	Aleksander Vinter	Killed by the Irony	(?)	Single	
(?)	Aleksander Vinter	The Birth of Bliss	(?)	Single	
(?)	Aleksander Vinter	The Sad Awakening	(?)	Single	
(?)	Aleksander Vinter	The Seven Seas	(?)	Single	
(?)	Aleksander Vinter	The Siege	(?)	Single	
(?)	Aleksander Vinter	Vision Bleak	(?)	Single	
(?)	Aleksander Vinter	Lowlander	(?)	Single	Later re-released on Highlander.
(?)	Aleksander Vinter	Battlestations/The Corrupted	(?)	Single	
(?)	Blanco	Dyland - Bienvenidos Al Party	(?)	Single	Produced by Blanco
(?)	Gunslinger Jones	To The Beach	(?)	Single	Featuring Twistex.
(?)	Gunslinger Jones	BT - Every Other Way	(?)	Remix	With Twistex
(?)	Morphine	My Abyss	(?)	Single	
(?)	Morphine	Anything Goes	(?)	Single	
(?)	Morphine	A Dirty Adventure	(?)	Single	
(?)	Morphine	The Adventures of Uncle Ruckus	(?)	Single	
(?)	Morphine	The Pirate Bay Anthem	(?)	Single	
(?)	Morphine	Back in Time	(?)	Single	
(?)	Morphine	Adraw - Faithful	(?)	Remix	
(?)	Ninjaspliff	Sinister Minister Beat	(?)	Single	
(?)	No Funeral	Kun en død	(?)	Single	Later re-released on Engler er Norske.
(?)	No Funeral	Froströyk	(?)	Single	Later re-released on Engler er Norske.
(?)	No Funeral	Adjø mine roser	(?)	Single	Later re-released on Engler er Norske.
(?)	No Funeral	Blodskam Genotyp	(?)	Single	Later re-released on Engler er Norske.
(?)	No Funeral	Gamle dager	(?)	Single	Later re-released on Engler er Norske.
(?)	No Funeral	Det bleke intet [instrumental]	(?)	Single	Later re-released non-instrumental on Sort Industri Symfoni.
(?)	No Funeral	En drøm	(?)	Single	
(?)	No Funeral	Virusblod	(?)	Single	
(?)	No Funeral	Morphine - War Cry	(?)	Remix	
(?)	Numa	Dj Spoke - Hypnotic	(?)	Remix	
(?)	Numa	King of the East	(?)	Single	
(?)	Savant	Invasion Unmastered	(?)	Album	Released on Vinter's SoundCloud page but taken down later.
(?)	Savant	Return	(?)	Single	VIP WIP.
(?)	Savant	Bluebloods - Back in the Days	(?)	Single	Produced by Aleksander Vinter.
(?)	Savant	Inflamer	(?)	Single	Trashed Alchemist WIP. Later re-released on Throwback Mix.
(?)	Savant	Red Claw	(?)	Single	VIP. Later re-released on Outcasts.
(?)	Savant	Cassette	(?)	Single	8th VIP
(?)	Savant	Make You Dream	(?)	Single	Alternative Edit/ WIP. Later re-released on Ninür.
(?)	Savant	Ocarine	(?)	Single	WIP. Later re-released on Ninür.
(?)	Savant	Terror Bite	(?)	Single	
(?)	Savant	Chop It	(?)	Single	Featuring Gino Sydal. VIP.
(?)	Savant	Sunny California	(?)	Single	WIP. Full version later released on Void.
(?)	Staal	Byggje ein mur	(?)	Single	
(?)	Staal	Daudeblod	(?)	Single	
(?)	Staal	Jeg lover	(?)	Single	
(?)	Staal	Rambokniv	(?)	Single	Later re-released as part of the album of the same name.
(?)	Staal	Speidargut	(?)	Single	
(?)	Protos	Aquarius	(?)	Single	WIP Metal Edit
(?)	Protos	Firstborn	(?)	Single	
(?)	Vinter in Hollywood	Stalker	(?)	Single	
(?)	Vinter in Hollywood	Just a machine	(?)	Single	
(?)	Vinter in Hollywood	My Nightmare Adventures	(?)	Single	
(?)	Vinter in Hollywood	This Robot Thing	(?)	Single	Untouched Mix.
(?)	Vinter in Hollywood	Lemonade	(?)	Single	Later re-released on Vinter in Hollywood.
(?)	Vinter in Hollywood	Viva La Cassette	(?)	Single	Later re-released on Vinter in Hollywood.
(?)	Vinter in Hollywood	Run Away	(?)	Single	
(?)	Vinter in Hollywood	Pain Control	(?)	Single	
(?)	Vinter in Hollywood	Nuclear	(?)	Single	
(?)	Vinter in Hollywood	Wake Up	(?)	Single	Reconstruction
(?)	Vinter in Hollywood	Ghetto Freaks	(?)	Single	
(?)	Vinter in Hollywood	Al Green - Love & Happiness	(?)	Remix	
(?)	Vinter in Hollywood	Blood Command - Some Inches Away From Death	(?)	Remix	
(?)	Vinter in Hollywood	Asia Today - I Love You	(?)	Remix	
(?)	Vinter in Hollywood	Radiohead - Everything In Its Right Place	(?)	Remix	
(?)	Vinter in Hollywood	Side Brok - E.g. Meina alt e.g. sei	(?)	Remix	
(?)	Vinter in Hollywood	Daft Punk - Harder, Better, Faster, Stronger	(?)	Remix	Later re-released on A House in Hollywood.
(?)	Vinter in Hollywood	Daft Punk - Superheroes	(?)	Remix	
(?)	Vinter in Hollywood	Nrk - Store Studio	(?)	Remix	Bootleg
(?)	Vinter in Hollywood	MaahesMa (/Stian Carlsen) - Maat	(?)	Remix	
(?)	Vinter in Hollywood	Deepsky - Ghost	(?)	Remix	
(?)	Vinter in Hollywood	Madonna Justin Timberlake - 4 Minutes	(?)	Remix	
(?)	Vinter in Hollywood	Eric Prydz - Call on Me	(?)	Remix	
(?)	Vinter in Hollywood	Timbaland ft. K. Hilson, D.O.E., Sebastian - The Way I Are	(?)	Remix	
2006	Morphine	Man Of The Law	(?)	Single	
2006	No Funeral	Catacombe Royal	(?)	Album	
2006	Starsheriffs	The Starsheriffs	December 31	Album	
2007	No Funeral	Engler er Norske	(?)	Album	
2007	Numa	Amnesia	(?)	Single	
2007	Numa	Remember	(?)	Single	
2007	Numa	Costa Rica	(?)	Single	
2007	Numa	Stripped 2007	(?)	Single	
2007	Aleksander Vinter	Perfect	(?)	Single	
2007	Aleksander Vinter	Warriors	(?)	Single	WIP
2007	Aleksander Vinter	Instant Nemesis	(?)	Single	
2008	Aleksander Vinter	Crusade	(?)	Single	
2008	Aleksander Vinter	Execution Rescue	(?)	Single	
2008	Ninjaspliff	Beats	(?)	Single	
2008	No Funeral	Sort Industri Symfoni	(?)	Album	
2008	Megatron	Shredder	January 1	Album	
2008	Twin World	Hardware Heaven	January 1	EP	
2008	Megatron	All Hail Megatron	May 22	Single	
2008	Aleksander Vinter	Valentin	August 20	Single	Fake movie theme.
2009	Aleksander Vinter	Say Yes	(?)	EP	
2009	Savant	My First Dubstep	(?)	EP	
2009	Protos	Overworld	(?)	EP	
2009	Vinter in Hollywood	Survival of the Fattest CD1: Bangers	(?)	Album	
2009	Vinter in Hollywood	Survival of the Fattest CD2: Destroy	(?)	Album	
2009	Vinter in Hollywood	Survival of the Fattest CD3: Ambience	(?)	Album	
2009	Vinter in Hollywood	Survival of the Fattest CD4: Disco	(?)	Album	
2009	Vinter in Hollywood	Virus	February 7 (?)	Single	
2009	Winterbliss	DragonFlower	January 1	EP	
2009	Vinter in Hollywood	Outbreak	May 7	EP	Pre-release EP to his album of the same name.
2009	Vinter in Hollywood	Outbreak	May 8	Album	
2010	Vinter in Hollywood	A House In Hollywood	(?)	Album	
2010	Aleksander Vinter	Castle Repercussions	(?)	Album	Soundtrack to the web-series Castle. Specifically the Castle Repercussions episodes.
2010	Aleksander Vinter	Nintendo Atmospheres	(?)	Album	
2010	Aleksander Vinter	D-Pad - ROFLGames	(?)	EP	
2010	Datakrash	Beats Vol. 1	(?)	Album	
2010	No Funeral	Blodtann	(?)	EP	Demo
2010	Savant	Follow Me	(?)	Single	
2010	Savant	Outlaw (Part 1)	(?)	Single	
2010	Savant	Aviatrix 2010	(?)	Single	Russ Track.
2010	Savant	Thrillseekers	August 5	EP	
2010	Vinter in Hollywood	Ride Like The Wind	August 8	Single	First song of his to pass 100k views on YouTube.
2010	The Christopher Walkens	Dead Surfers Club	October 10	EP	
2010	Blanco	The Mother Of God And A Filthy Whore	October 10	EP	Also known as Latidos De Las Niñas.
2010	Vinter in Vegas	Mindfighting	October 10	Album	
2010	Vinter in Hollywood	MASKS	November 27	EP	
2010	Vinter in Hollywood	You Can Play	December 3	Single	
2011	Vinter in Hollywood	Vinter In Hollywood	(?)	Album	
2011	Vinter in Hollywood	Blood and Happiness	(?)	Mixtape	Contains Beats Vol. 2, the Antihero EP, the Masquerade EP, the No Funeral Albums, the Shredder Album and the Album named Vinter in Hollywood.
2011	Vinter in Hollywood	Gunslinger Jones	(?)	Single	
2011	Aleksander Vinter	Antihero	(?)	EP	
2011	Aleksander Vinter	Masquerade	(?)	EP	
2011	Datakrash	Beats Vol. 2	(?)	Album	
2011	Datakrash	Nybegynner	(?)	Single	Prod. Datakrash.
2011	Savant	Retro	(?)	Single	Russ track
2011	Savant	Cuba Libre	(?)	Single	Russ track
2011	Savant	Stars & Stripes	(?)	Single	Russ track
2011	Savant	Relations	(?)	Single	Russ track. Snobe prod. Aleksander Vinter.
2011	Savant	Suburban	(?)	Single	Russ track. Beck & Ruud prod. Savant.
2011	Savant	Airforce 11	(?)	Single	Russ track. Marius Beck & 8-Tease feat. Aleksander Vinter.
2011	Savant	In the Kitchen	(?)	Single	Russ track. Marius Beck feat. Aleksander Vinter.
2011	Savant	Yabba Dabba Doo	(?)	Single	Russ track. Marius Beck feat. Aleksander Vinter.
2011	Savant	Operation Freedom	(?)	Single	Russ track. Feat. Simon Aasen.
2011	Savant	16-Bit Lightsaber	(?)	Single	Part of the V for Vinter Mixtape. Demo Tracks.
2011	Savant	Brute	(?)	Single	Part of the V for Vinter Mixtape. Demo Tracks.
2011	Savant	Code	(?)	Single	Part of the V for Vinter Mixtape. Demo Tracks.
2011	Savant	Hero	(?)	Single	Part of the V for Vinter Mixtape. Demo Tracks.
2011	Savant	Kill You	(?)	Single	Part of the V for Vinter Mixtape. Demo Tracks.
2011	Savant	Learn to Obrain	(?)	Single	Part of the V for Vinter Mixtape. Demo Tracks.
2011	Savant	Medicine	(?)	Single	Part of the V for Vinter Mixtape. Demo Tracks.
2011	Savant	Maximus	(?)	Single	Part of the V for Vinter Mixtape. Demo Tracks.
2011	Savant	Crackpipe Dildo	(?)	Single	Part of the V for Vinter Mixtape. Demo Track. Broken Glass Mix.
2011	Savant	Reaper	(?)	Single	Part of the V for Vinter Mixtape. Demo Track. Later re-released on Throwback Mix.
2011	Savant	Bitchkiss	(?)	Single	Part of the V for Vinter Mixtape.
2011	Savant	Door to a Room	(?)	Single	Part of the V for Vinter Mixtape.
2011	Savant	Mushroom Clouds	(?)	Single	Part of the V for Vinter Mixtape.
2011	Savant	Rocky X	(?)	Single	Part of the V for Vinter Mixtape.
2011	Savant	Street Fighter	(?)	Single	Part of the V for Vinter Mixtape.
2011	Savant	The Third Eye	(?)	Single	Part of the V for Vinter Mixtape. Pre-Album Edit.
2011	Savant	Wanna be friends	(?)	Single	Featuring Twistex, Sebastian & Noisia. Part of the V for Vinter Mixtape.
2011	Savant	Welcome to Death	(?)	Single	Part of the V for Vinter Mixtape. Later re-released on Throwback Mix.
2011	Savant	Bindie	(?)	Single	Part of the V for Vinter Mixtape. Bonus Tracks.
2011	Savant	Misfit	(?)	Single	Part of the V for Vinter Mixtape. Bonus Tracks.
2011	Savant	My Mouth	(?)	Single	Part of the V for Vinter Mixtape. Bonus Tracks.
2011	Savant	UCANDO	(?)	Single	Part of the V for Vinter Mixtape. Bonus Tracks.
2011	Savant	ICANDO	(?)	Single	Part of the V for Vinter Mixtape. Bonus Track. Vinter claims that he made the whole track with only his mouth.
2011	Savant	Mastermind	(?)	Single	WIP/First Version. Later re-released on Mindmelt EP.
2011	Savant	Are You	(?)	Single	Feat. Twistex.
2011	Savant	Indoctrination	(?)	Single	
2011	Savant	Make Up Your Mind	(?)	Single	
2011	Savant	Document One - Clap	(?)	Remix	Part of the V for Vinter Mixtape.
2011	Savant	Blanco - Backdoor Access	(?)	Remix	Part of the V for Vinter Mixtape.
2011	Savant	Immortal - Tyrants	(?)	Remix	Part of the V for Vinter Mixtape.
2011	Savant	Savant feat. Vreid - Savant	(?)	Remix	Part of the V for Vinter Mixtape.
2011	Savant	Montée - Rendition of You	(?)	Remix	Part of the V for Vinter Mixtape. Later re-released on Throwback Mix.
2011	Savant	Savant - The Third Eye	(?)	Remix	Savants Poison Remix
2011	Vinter in Hollywood	Suppressor	February 10	Single	
2011	Vinter in Hollywood	Synthesizer Love	March 30	Single	
2011	Savant	Blue Magic	April 30	Single	ft. Snobe
2011	Savant	V for Vinter	May 7	Mixtape	Contains the My First Dupstep EP, the Thrillseekers EP as well as a few Demo and Bonus Tracks, plus some Remixes and Free Tracks.
2011	Vinter in Vegas	Mamachine	June 16	Album	
2011	Savant	Ninur	October 13	Single	Later released as the title track of the album of the same name.
2011	Savant	Ninur	November 11	Album	
2011	Savant	Robosexual	November 16	Single	Part of the V for Vinter Mixtape. Later re-released on Throwback Mix.
2011	Savant	Not Avicii	November 25	Single	Part of the V for Vinter Mixtape.
2011	Savant	New beats 'n' stuff	December 13	Mixtape	Mostly Vario demos.
2012	Savant	Lost	(?)	Single	Russ tracks
2012	Savant	Avion	(?)	Single	Russ tracks
2012	Savant	Expedition 2012	(?)	Single	Russ tracks
2012	Savant	Paramnesia	(?)	Single	Feat. Bluebloods & Russehit. Russ Track.
2012	Savant	Good Times	(?)	Single	
2012	Savant	Dishonored	(?)	Single	
2012	Savant	Power Up	(?)	Single	Unfinished / Prewiev. Later re-released on Outcasts.
2012	Savant	Prism Break	(?)	Single	Unfinished / Prewiev.
2012	Savant	Rude Gal (Cupcake Nightmare)	(?)	Single	Demo Version of Rude Gal
2012	Savant	OK Alright	(?)	Single	Gino Sydal feat. Savant
2012	Savant	Wreckless Driving	(?)	Single	With Twistex.
2012	Savant	Dream Of You	(?)	Single	With Twistex. Part of Twistex's Bassooka EP.
2012	Savant	Breathless	(?)	Single	Featuring Twistex
2012	Savant	Government	(?)	Single	
2012	Savant	Super Sheriff	(?)	Single	
2012	Savant	Space Cowboy	(?)	Single	
2012	Savant	Kids	(?)	Single	
2012	Savant	I'obscurite	(?)	Single	
2012	Savant	Sines	(?)	Single	Sins WIP. Part of the V for Vinter Mixtape.
2012	Savant	Its a Trap	(?)	Single	Featuring Admiral Ackbar.
2012	Savant	Kelis - Milkshake	(?)	Remix	
2012	Savant	Dev feat. Timbaland - Don't Hurt It	(?)	Remix	With Svanur
2012	Savant	P!INK - Get this party started	(?)	Remix	
2012	Savant	Zedd - Spectrum	(?)	Remix	
2012	Savant	Bob Log III - Log Bomb	(?)	Remix	
2012	Savant	Shackles - No Sleep	(?)	Remix	
2012	Savant	Blood Command - High Five For Life	(?)	Remix	Later re-released on Throwback Mix.
2012	Savant	Danger - 4h30	(?)	Remix	
2012	Savant	Pharoahe Monch - I shot the Mayor	(?)	Remix	
2012	Savant	Armand Van Helden - Into Your Eyes	(?)	Remix	
2012	Savant	Love Automatic - Nightmare	(?)	Remix	With Twistex.
2012	Vinter in Hollywood	Take Care Of You	(?)	Single	
2012	Vinter in Hollywood	Symphony Of Lies	(?)	Single	
2012	Savant	Rolling Stone	January 5	Single	Part of the V for Vinter Mixtape.
2012	Savant	Alphas	February 2	Single	Russ track. Part of the V for Vinter Mixtape.
2012	Savant	Mother Russia	February 12	Single	
2012	Savant	Beats 'n' stuff VOL 2	February 17	Mixtape	
2012	Staal	Rambokniv	March 16	Album	
2012	Savant	Vario	March 21	Album	
2012	Savant	License To Chill	April 13	Single	Russ track. Axel Morris feat. Savant & Celina Svanberg.
2012	Savant	Psykick	May 17	Single	Later re-released on Outcasts.
2012	Savant	Positive Vibes	May 18	Single	Featuring Twistex.
2012	Savant	Agape	May 19	Single	Later re-released on Throwback Mix.
2012	Savant	Random Beats Vol 1	June 4	Mixtape	
2012	Savant	Overworld	June 6	Album	
2012	Savant	Space Cowboy	June 23	Single	
2012	Savant	Mindmelt	June 24	EP	Never officially released due to a hard drive crash.
2012	Savant	Trevor	July 11	Single	Vocals by Kiatzuki.
2012	Savant	The Ritalin Project	July 17	EP	Collaboration project with Donny Goines.
2012	Savant	Ksh'mir	August 1	Single	
2012	Savant	secret stuff	August 21	Mixtape	AKA Bit Bandits.
2012	Savant	Shake The Room	August 28	Single	
2012	Savant	ISM	September 9	Album	
2012	Savant	Random Demos	September 25	Mixtape	Mostly Alchemist demos.
2012	Savant	Ode To Joy	September 26	Single	Later re-released on Outcasts at an 8.3% reduced speed and pitch.
2012	Savant	He Was A Moog	October 5	Single	
2012	Savant	Alchemist	December 12	Album	
2012	Savant	Vario 64	December 25	Single	Later released as part of Overkill.
2012	Savant	Wade in the Water	December 28	Single	
2012	Savant	Wildstyle	December 31	Single	Later released as part of Overkill.
2013	Savant	Aces Sleeved	(?)	Single	Later released as part of Overkill.
2013	Savant	1 Minute Sunday Techno	(?)	Single	
2013	Savant	Mountain Of Death	(?)	Single	
2013	Savant	Fy Farao	(?)	Single	Russ Track. Feat. Twistex.
2013	Savant	Savant on Mushrooms	(?)	Single	Part of Infected Mushroom's Friend On Mushrooms, Vol. 2
2013	Savant	Ratrace	(?)	Single	Bluebloods prod. Savant.
2013	Savant	Future Trap	(?)	Single	
2013	Savant	Wasteland	(?)	Single	
2013	Savant	Ascent	(?)	Single	Created as an intro track to his tribute video game, Savant Ascent.
2013	Savant	Memory	(?)	Single	Later re-released on Outcasts.
2013	Savant	Zelda's Lullaby	(?)	Single	
2013	Savant	Sweet	(?)	Single	Later re-released on Jester.
2013	Savant	Ride the Beat	(?)	Single	Feat. Wankaego
2013	Savant	Skepsis - Into Temptation	(?)	Remix	
2013	Savant	Justice - Audio Video Disco	(?)	Remix	Bootleg
2013	Savant	We Are Castor - Eskimo	(?)	Remix	
2013	Savant	Scatman John - Scatman	(?)	Remix	With Au5, Fractal and Prismatic.
2013	Savant	NEUS - Turn It Up	(?)	Remix	
2013	Savant	Swedish House Mafia - Don't You Worry Child	(?)	Remix	
2013	Savant	Snoop Dogg - Drop it like it's hot	(?)	Remix	
2013	Savant	Keane - Spiralling	(?)	Remix	Bootleg
2013	Savant	Slipknot - Duality	(?)	Remix	Part of the Waffle Mix.
2013	Savant	The White Stripes - Seven Nation Army	(?)	Remix	Part of the Waffle Mix.
2013	Savant	Shark	January 7	Single	Later released as part of Overkill.
2013	Savant	End of Intelligence	February 1	Single	
2013	Savant	Light Years	February 21	Single	Featuring Raizhell.
2013	Savant	Overkill	March 7	Album	Collection of singles alongside some new tracks.
2013	Savant	♥ (Heart)	March 13	EP	
2013	Savant	Black Swan	April 5	Single	Russ tracks
2013	Savant	UNTZ	April 6	Single	Russ tracks
2013	Savant	The Arcade	April 19	Single	Russ tracks
2013	Savant	Archive Mix	April 25	Mixtape	
2013	Savant	Carmageddon	April 26	Single	Russ track
2013	Savant	Four Days	May 6	EP	Collab EP with AdamK and JELO created in 4 days while Savant was on tour staying with them.
2013	Savant	Cult	July 7	Album	Was released with 10 tracks, with four "Japan Bonus Tracks" added after release.
2013	Savant	Pokermon	August 9	Single	Created for episode 3 of season 2 of Video Game High School.
2013	Savant	Thank You	September 16	EP	Officially available through Savant: Complete as well as remade versions on Outcasts.
2013	Savant	Fatality	September 27	Single	
2013	Savant	Vanity	October 27	Single	
2013	Savant	Savant's 75 Minute Underground Hip-Hop Mixtape	December 2	Mixtape	Later re-uploaded to new SoundCloud account.
2013	Savant	Orakel	December 11	Album	
2014	Savant	Frozen Flames	(?)	Single	Feat. Savant & Gino Sydal. Part of Twistex's Lume EP.
2014	Savant	Rise Up	(?)	Single	Infected Mushroom Feat. Savant. Part of Infected Mushroom's Friends on Mushrooms Vol. 3.
2014	Savant	Zombies Mixtape	January 4	Mixtape	
2014	Savant	Amerika	January 6	Single	
2014	Savant	Mellow	January 8	Single	Vocals by Lucy Swann.
2014	Savant	Cloud Rider	January 15	Single	
2014	Savant	Veritech	January 28	Single	
2014	Savant	Rude Gal	January 30	Single	
2014	Savant	Dragon Fire	March 14	Single	With Virus Syndicate
2014	Savant	Elephant	March 26	Single	
2014	Savant	Space Tour	April 1	Mixtape	
2014	Savant	Walk On Me	May 2	Single	
2014	Savant	Unfinished Business	May 17	Mixtape	
2014	Savant	Derby	July 7	Single	Featuring JELO.
2014	Savant	Mother Russia 2	July 15	Single	
2014	Savant	Drop It On Ya!	August 3	Single	With Gino Sydal.
2014	Savant	Cult Collab	August 3	Single	Collaboration song made entirely out of samples sent to Savant by his fans.
2014	Savant	Protos	August 8	Album	
2014	Savant	Synesthesia	August 15	Single	Part of the Bass for Autism dedicated to raise awareness for Autism.
2014	Savant	Throwback Mix	August 27	Mixtape	
2014	Savant	Waffle Mix	August 29	Mixtape	
2014	Savant	Zion	December 13	Album	
2015	Savant	Fakers	(?)	Single	String Arrangement / Orchestral VIP of Fakers from Protos.
2015	Savant	Unity	(?)	Single	WIP
2015	Savant	Dimensions	(?)	Single	WIP
2015	Savant	jeal·ous	(?)	Single	
2015	Savant	Fraulein	(?)	Single	
2015	Savant	Danny L Harle - In My Dreams	(?)	Remix	Bootleg.
2015	Savant	Invasion	January 26	Album	
2015	Savant	Hip-Hop Mixtape vol. 2	March 3	Mixtape	
2015	Savant	Up In Smoke	April 23	Single	Russ tracks
2015	Savant	Up In Smoke (VIP)	April 23	Single	Russ tracks
2015	Savant	Metal Mixtape	April 26	Mixtape	Contains tracks by Winterbliss, Megatron, Staal, and No Funeral.
2015	Savant	Moonriser	May 1	Single	
2015	Savant	Ambient & Chillout Mixtape	May 26	Mixtape	
2015	Blanco	Wes - Alane	July 7	Remix	
2015	Savant	DJ Set 2015	July 28	Mixtape	
2015	Blanco	Turbulence - Notorious	August 7	Remix	Bootleg
2015	Blanco	Puerto Rico	August 9	Single	
2015	Blanco	Noob & Brodinski - Peanuts Club	September 5	Remix	
2015	Blanco	Starfish (VIP)	September 10	Single	Blanco remix of Savant - Starfish.
2015	Blanco	Chris Brown - Loyal	September 30	Remix	
2015	Blanco	Carpe Diem	October 23	Single	Featuring Turbulence. Later released as part of Bajo.
2015	Savant	Furion	October 9	Single	
2015	Savant	Slasher	October 29	Single	Later added as a bonus track to the album of the same name.
2015	Blanco	Camarilla	November 6	Single	Featuring DYLAND. Later released as part of Bajo.
2015	Blanco	Bailamos	November 13	Single	Featuring Eben Jr. Later released as part of Bajo.
2015	Blanco	Salsa Verde DJ Set	November 13	Mixtape	
2015	Blanco	Bajo	November 20	EP	
2015	Savant	Origin (VIP)	December 11	Single	
2015	Savant	I LOVE TECHNO	December 21	Single	
2016	Savant	Kill the Noise & Feed Me - I Do Coke	(?)	Remix	Acoustic Cover
2016	Savant	Fire	January 1	Single	
2016	Savant	FlippKlipp Studio Theme	January 19	Single	
2016	Savant	Cassette	January 24	Single	Technically an album, consists of 7 tracks based on one song, all in different genres.
2016	Savant	Savior	March 4	Single	
2016	Savant	Forsaken	April 8	Single	
2016	Savant	F A B R I C S	May 10	Single	
2016	Savant	H U S T L E R	May 11	Single	
2016	Savant	Get It Get It	July 1	Single	Featuring DMX and Snoop Dogg.
2016	Savant	Vybz	July 15	Album	
2016	Aleksander Vinter	ISM (Suite)	September 11	Single	Orchestral suite for ISM's 4th anniversary compiled of several melodies from the album.
2016	Aleksander Vinter	Menace	September 11	Single	
2016	Aleksander Vinter	Phantom Voyage	September 11	Single	
2016	Aleksander Vinter	Status Quo Adventure	September 12	Single	
2016	Aleksander Vinter	Just a Piano	September 13	Single	
2016	Aleksander Vinter	Modern Thrill	September 15	Single	
2016	Aleksander Vinter	Sweet Dreams	September 15	Single	
2016	Savant	Outcasts	October 21	Album	4-CD collection of old singles, IDs, and WIP/VIPs.
2016	Aleksander Vinter	Ghosts in Love	November 6	Single	
2016	Aleksander Vinter	Waiting Theme	November 17	Single	Re-released from Nintendo Atmospheres.
2016	Aleksander Vinter	A.I	December 6	Single	
2016	Aleksander Vinter	Masquerade: High Sea Theme	December 7	Single	Re-release of Adventure from Masquerade.
2017	Savant	The Videokid	(?)	Single	Soundtrack for The Videokid game by PixelTrip Studios.
2017	Datakrash	Night Watch	January 16	Single	
2017	Datakrash	Atlantis	January 25	Single	
2017	Savant	The Black Room	March 11	Album	Soundtrack for the movie The Black Room. All official sources from Cleopatra records as well as news articles on the album state it as a Savant release, when Vinter himself has said it was made under Aleksander Vinter.
2017	Savant	Surprise	March 13	Single	Later added as a track on Jester, with different mastering and a new feature artist: Gaia.
2017	Savant	Jester	April 17	Album	Was remastered on 01.04.2018
2017	Aleksander Vinter	Lost in the Forest	April 21	Single	
2017	Datakrash	Savage	May 5	EP	Vinyl release.
2017	Datakrash	Special kind of Love	May 12	Single	
2017	Datakrash	Overdrive	May 21	Single	
2017	Spray & Play Games	Retro Bundle	June 30	Album	
2017	Aleksander Vinter	War	July 30	Single	
2017	Datakrash	No	August 1	Single	Edited version of track of same title on Savage EP.
2017	Datakrash	Seasons	August 20	Single	
2017	Aleksander Vinter	Role Playing Atmosphere	September 1	Single	
2017	Datakrash	Papercut	September 3	Single	
2017	Aleksander Vinter	Samba De Janerio	September 4	Single	Orchestral Arrangement.
2017	Datakrash	Feelin	September 10	Single	
2017	Datakrash	Listen	September 20	Single	
2017	Datakrash	Hype Mode	September 27	Single	
2017	Datakrash	Mood Mode	October 8	Mixtape	
2017	Datakrash	Savage	November 1	EP	Digital release. Includes additional bonus instrumental track.
2017	Savant	Jonathan Geer - Owlboy Theme	November 1	Remix	
2017	Vinter	Online	November 3	Single	Produced by Datakrash.
2017	Aleksander Vinter	Mercy	November 18	Single	
2017	Datakrash	Slicker	November 23	Single	
2017	Datakrash	Red Carpet	November 27	Single	
2017	Datakrash	90's Babies	December 21	Single	With ToBy, Later featured in the Mixtape ToBy Season Vol. I
2018	Datakrash	ToBy Season Vol. I	February 23	Album	By ToBy, prod. Datakrash
2018	Aleksander Vinter	Star Trek: The Next Generation	March 5	Single	Piano Arrangement
2018	Aleksander Vinter	James Bond	March 5	Remix	
2018	Aleksander Vinter	Fiddler	March 13	Single	
2018	Datakrash	90's Babies Datakrash Remixes	March 27	EP	
2018	Aleksander Vinter	Highlander	March 30	Album	
2018	Datakrash	Rihanna - Work	April 10	Remix	Feat. Drake
2018	Datakrash	Migos - Bad and Boujee	April 11	Remix	Feat. Lil Uzi Vert
2018	Datakrash	Dr. Dre - Still D.R.E.	April 12	Remix	Feat. Snoop Dogg
2018	Datakrash	Future - Mask Off	April 13	Remix	
2018	Datakrash	Post Malone - Rockstar	April 14	Remix	Feat. 21 Savage
2018	Datakrash	Show U Off	June 1	Single	By ToBy, prod. by Datakrash
2018	Blanco	Triad	August 17	Single	Later re-released as part of Calypso
2018	Blanco	Calypso	August 31	Album	
2018	Datakrash	OK//Wolf of the night	September 7	Single	By ToBy, prod. by Datakrash
2018	Datakrash	Walk	September 15	Single	By ToBy, prod. by Datakrash
2018	Datakrash	Preacher	September 21	Single	By ToBy, prod. by Datakrash
2018	Datakrash	On My Own	September 28	Single	By ToBy, prod. by Datakrash
2018	Savant	Slasher	October 26	Album	Not to be confused with the Single of the same name. Original Soundtrack by Savant.
2018	Datakrash	Anthology Part 1 - Boom Bap & Cadillacs	December 21	Mixtape	Includes various tracks from Beats Vol. 1 & 2 as well as Savant's 75 Minute Underground Hip-Hop Mixtape.
2019	Savant	Keep Me Down	January 10	Single	By Gaia, prod. and written by Savant.
2019	Datakrash	My Lane	January 28	Single	By ToBy, prod. Datakrash
2019	Savant	Birds	March 14	Single	By Gaia, prod. and written by Savant.
2019	Datakrash	Back	April 7	Single	By ToBy, prod. Datakrash
2019	Savant	Mortals	June 6	Album	Original Soundtrack by Savant.
2019	Savant	Monolith	September 25	Single	Re-released on Void.
2019	Savant	Travis Scott - 90210	November 12	Single	Vocal Cover by Gaia. Piano by Aleksander Vinter.
2019	Aleksander Vinter	h o m e	November 14	Album	1 Hour ambient music for working and relaxing
2019	Aleksander Vinter	a u r a	November 25	Album	1 Hour ambient music for working and relaxing
2020	Savant	Im Hot	March 17	Single	Re-released on Void.
2020	Savant	Void	April 4	Album	
2020	Savant	Gaia - Lockdown	April 10	Single	Prod. by Aleksander Vinter.
2020	Savant	Insert Coin (Ost)	December 16	Album	Original Soundtrack by Savant.
2021	Savant	Snake	January 4	Single	Later re-released on Void DLC.
2021	Savant	Void DLC	January 21	Album	
2022	Savant	Madness II	January 16	Single	Later re-released on Krang.
2022	Savant	Bloodthirst	January 23	Single	Later re-released on Krang.
2022	Savant	Punch	January 29	Single	Later re-released on Krang.
2022	Savant	Krang	February 2	Album	
