= ISMS =

ISMS may refer to:

- -isms, a suffix commonly used in philosophy and politics
- Information security management system, an information security policy
- Integrated Safety Management System, a form of Safety Management System
- Inner Sydney Montessori School, Australia
- International Society of Military Sciences, an international military research organization
- Intelligent Short Message Service
- "Isms" (song), song by American band Dog Eat Dog

== See also ==
- ISM (disambiguation)
