= TCPS =

TCPS may refer to:

- Town Centre Private Schools
- Tennessee Christian Preparatory School
- Tri-Council Policy Statement: Ethical Conduct for Research Involving Humans
