= Blake High School =

Blake High School may refer to:

In the United States:

- Howard W. Blake High School - Tampa, Florida
- James Hubert Blake High School - Silver Spring, Maryland

== See also ==
- Blake School (disambiguation)
