= Hudson Country Montessori School =

Montessori school in New England, United States

- New Rochelle, New York, and Danbury, Connecticut; United States

Information
- Other name: HCMS
- Type: Independent, Montessori
- Established: 1972; 54 years ago
- Founder: Musya “Amalie” Meyer
- Head teacher: Mark Meyer
- Grades: Infant–8
- Gender: Co-educational
- Age range: Infant–14 years
- Language: English
- Campus type: Suburban
- Accreditation: American Montessori Society (AMS); New England Association of Schools and Colleges (NEASC); National Association for the Education of Young Children (NAEYC)
- Website: www.hudsoncountry.org

Hudson Country Montessori School (HCMS) is an independent, co-educational Montessori school with campuses in New Rochelle, New York, and Danbury, Connecticut. It serves students from infancy (at the Danbury campus) and toddler age through eighth grade.

== History ==
The school was founded in New Rochelle in 1972 by Musya "Amalie" Meyer (1924–2014), an educator in the American Montessori movement. Meyer served as Vice President of Teacher Development on the board of the American Montessori Society and co-authored the book Celebrations of Life with Tim Seldin.

In 1995, the school opened a second campus in Danbury to serve families in Fairfield County. This expansion was led by Mark Meyer, Musya Meyer's son.

== See also ==
- American Montessori Society
- List of Montessori schools
