= Seldin =

Seldin is a surname. Notable people with the surname include:

- Abigail Seldin (born 1988), American edtech entrepreneur
- Cletus Seldin (born 1986), American super lightweight boxer
- Donald Seldin (1920–2018), American nephrologist
- Millard Seldin (1926–2020), American real estate developer, banker, basketball investor, and horsebreeder
- Ronnie Nyogetsu Reishin Seldin (1947–2017), American shakuhachi player
- Tim Seldin (born 1946), American educator
