= The Black Room (2017 film) =

- Directed by: Rolfe Kanefsky
- Written by: Rolfe Kanefsky
- Produced by: Esther Goodstein
- Starring: Natasha Henstridge; Lukas Hassel; Lin Shaye
- Cinematography: Kyle Stryker
- Music by: Savant
- Production company: Cleopatra Entertainment
- Release date: August 11, 2017 (Spain)
- Running time: 91 minutes
- Country: United States
- Language: English

The Black Room is an American horror film written and directed by Rolfe Kanefsky. It stars Natasha Henstridge, Lukas Hassel and Lin Shaye.

== Synopsis ==
Newlyweds Jennifer and Paul have moved into what is meant to become a dream home, only to discover that their basement contains a black room that houses a demonic presence that uses lust and arousal to conquer human souls.

== Cast ==
- Natasha Henstridge as Jennifer
- Lukas Hassel as Paul
- Alex Rinehart as Dawn
- Lin Shaye as Miss Black
- Tiffany Shepis as Monica
- Robert Donavan as Oscar
- Caleb Scott as Howard
- Augie Duke as Karen

== Production ==
Filming took place during 2016. Esther Goodstein and David Skye served as producers, while Brian Perera executively produced.

== Release ==
The Black Room received a limited theatrical release on April 28, 2017, in the United States, followed by a VOD release that same year. The production company released a trailer for the movie in the weeks preceding the limited theatrical run. FirstShowing.net was critical of the trailer, as they felt that "From the looks of it, this doesn't seem like anything particular special. There's new horror films being made all the time, and this one seems forgettable despite the marketing."

== Soundtrack ==
The film's score was created and performed by Savant, with additional tracks by artists Arthur Brown, Lynn Anderson, and Brainticket. Keith Emerson and Greg Lake also contributed to the soundtrack; their contribution was performed by The Royal Philharmonic Orchestra. The soundtrack was released via Cleopatra Records.

== Reception ==
The Los Angeles Times stated that the film was "unabashedly trashy — with scene after scene of nudity and gore — but doesn’t offer much beyond sensation." Horror outlet HorrorNews.net was also critical, expressing sympathy for Hendstrige's acting career and writing "It’s filled with poor acting and some bad dialogue. The wonderful practical effects are wasted here. Stick a fork in this turkey, it’s done. Not recommended."
