= Oneness-Family School =

Independent day school in Chevy Chase, MD, US

- 6701 Wisconsin Avenue; Chevy Chase, Maryland; United States

Information
- Type: Independent
- Established: May 18, 1988; 38 years ago
- Head of school: Andrew Kutt
- Grades: Preschool through 12
- Enrollment: 146
- Average class size: 17
- Student to teacher ratio: 1:12
- Website: www.onenessfamily.org

Oneness-Family School is an independent, coeducational day school whose lower-school campus is in Chevy Chase, Maryland, and its upper-school campus is in Kensington, Maryland. It offers a Montessori education for students age 2 through grade 12, making it the only private Montessori high school in the Washington, D.C., area. A nonprofit organization with 501(c)(3)status, the school is a member of the American Montessori Society and National Association of Independent Schools.

Patricia (Pat) Dubin is the chair of the board of trustees. Andrew Genova, a former alumnus, serves as the treasurer. Andrew Kutt is the head of school.

== History ==
Kutt was working at the Barrie School in Silver Spring in January 1988 when he first discussed the idea of founding a school with Barrie headmaster Tim Seldin. Oneness-Family School was incorporated in the District of Columbia on May 18, 1988, and held its first classes the following September with 10 students.

The lower school, pre-school through 8th grade, is located on the grounds of St. John's Episcopal Church, Norwood Parish, in Chevy Chase. In 2017, the school added a second campus, for high school students, at Grace Episcopal Day School in Kensington.

== Demographics ==
In 2017-18, the racial makeup of Oneness-Family School's K–12 students was 74.4% white, 10.2% Hispanic, 10.2% African American, and 5.1% Asian/Pacific Islander.

About 40% of families are international, representing more than 60 countries.

== Academics ==
Keeping with Montessori principles, students learn in mixed-age groups instead of single-grade classrooms. Those include the Little Stars program for 2- and 3-year-olds, the Children's Peace Garden for 3-year-olds to kindergarteners, the Peace Arbor for grades 1 to 3, the Peace Academy for grades 4 and 5, the Peace Ambassadors program for grades 6 to 8, and the high school program for grades 9 to 12.

The curriculum emphasizes global awareness and the study of other cultures. Students annually celebrate the founding of the United Nations with diplomats stationed in the local area.

In addition to traditional academic subjects, Oneness-Family School teaches nature experiences, meditation, yoga, and tai chi to help students work on self-discipline and relaxation as part of its Self-Discovery curriculum.
