= New Horizon Montessori School =

Coordinates: 35.85158°N 83.96012°W

New Horizon Montessori School is a Montessori school, grades preschool through 5, located in Louisville, Tennessee. It is also a training center for Montessori Educators International, Inc.

== New Horizon ==
New Horizon Montessori School was founded in 1978 in Maryville, Tennessee. In 1981, it moved to its present location, 913 E. Cumberland Dr., in neighboring Louisville. It is the only Montessori elementary school in Blount County, although it was joined by a new Montessori Middle School in 2008. The school includes an Early Childhood classroom, for ages 2 through kindergarten, and an Elementary classroom, with grades 1 through 5.

The head of school is the founder, Aleta Ledendecker.

=== Environmental Education ===
In addition to its academic curriculum and its focus on personal development, New Horizon is an Earth Circle School, emphasizing environmental responsibility. Among the school policies are guidelines for bringing low-waste materials in student's lunches and incorporation of environmental education into school activities. New Horizon is a signer of the Earth Charter USA.

== MEI ==
Montessori Educators International, Inc., offered training to teachers wishing to become accredited in Montessori education. Courses were generally offered in the summer and were available for two age levels: Level I/Early Childhood (ages 2 through 6) and Level 2/Elementary (ages 6 through 12). The Level I course lasts four weeks; the Level II course, six weeks. MEI was previously accredited through Montessori Accreditation Council for Teacher Education (MACTE).
