= Blake School =

Blake School may refer to:

- The Blake School (Minneapolis)
- Blake School (Plantation, Florida)
- Blake School (Lake City, Florida)
