= Montessori school (disambiguation) =

A Montessori school uses Montessori education, a teaching method encouraging autodidacticism.

Montessori school may also refer to:

- One of the list of Montessori schools
- Montessori School station, a former railroad stop on the New Hope Railroad in Buckingham Township, Pennsylvania

== See also ==
- Montessori (disambiguation)
