= Wings of Evolution =

Wings Of Evolution
- A Revolutionary system of education made possible for homeless and underprivileged children.
- Directed by: Raghu Jeganathan Ramesh Mourthy
- Written by: Kousalya Jegnathan
- Produced by: Ramesh Mourthy Mohandass Radhakrishnan
- Cinematography: Raja
- Edited by: Raghu Jeganathan
- Music by: Srikanth Devarajan
- Release date: 2007
- Running time: 48 minutes
- Country: United States
- Languages: English; Tamil

Wings of Evolution is a 2007 documentary film about the revolutionary educational system of the Siragu Montessori School, a school for homeless and underprivileged children, located in the outskirts of Chennai in Tamil Nadu, India. For a long time, the focus of education in India has been one of compulsory learning procedures, rote learning and examination-based evaluation with no emphasis on children's understanding of concepts, critical thinking and implications in their life outside school.

Siragu Montessori School, in spite of limited resources and great obstacles has maintained a quality program, free for those who attend.

The Documentary film focuses on bringing together children from around the world, through a worldwide postcard sharing workshop in which the children share thoughts, exchange ideas and promote cultural diversity, global peace and understanding towards building a better tomorrow.

Fund raising for the Wings Of Evolution - Siragu Montessori School is undertaken by Positive People Today which is a 501 (c3) non-profit organization, which aims to unite human beings all over the Earth on the simple principle of "Positive Thinking".
