= Montessori (disambiguation) =

Montessori education is a method of education.

Montessori may also refer to:

- Maria Montessori (1870–1952), Italian physician, educator, philosopher, humanitarian and founder of the education method
- Elisa Montessori (born 1931), Italian painter
- Montessori (crater), a crater on Venus

== See also ==
- Montessori school (disambiguation)
- American Montessori Society
