= Northglade Montessori Magnet School =

Location
- 1914 Cobb Avenue; Kalamazoo, Michigan 49007; United States
- 42°18′36″N 85°35′38″W

Information
- School type: Magnet Montessori
- Established: August 2001
- School district: Kalamazoo Public Schools
- School number: 02762
- Principal: ReQwal Duckworth
- Teaching staff: 12.50 (FTE)
- Grades: k-5
- Gender: Coeducational
- Age range: 5-12
- Enrollment: 236 (2018–19)
- Student to teacher ratio: 18.88
- Affiliation: American Montessori Society

Northglade Montessori Magnet School is a public elementary magnet school for students grades K-5, operated by the Kalamazoo Public Schools, located in Kalamazoo, Michigan, United States. It was established in August 2001 by the restructuring of Northglade Elementary School. The school serves around 250 children, of whom 83% are black and 13% white. Children learn through the Montessori Method of guided exploration rather than through traditional educational methods. The principal is ReQwal Duckworth. They Currently offer a basketball program through Premier Athletics.

Northglade reorganized and each of its teachers began intensified training to receive a master's degree in the Montessori method. It is the first public elementary school in Michigan to become accredited by the American Montessori Society and only the second in the US.

Northglade Elementary School was Kalamazoo Public Schools' top-performing elementary school in 1996–97. Each spring term students from the Kalamazoo College Chemistry Department worked with Northglade Elementary School on projects that culminated in the school's annual Science Expo.
