= Midland Montessori School =

Coordinates: 43.6502°N 84.2478°W

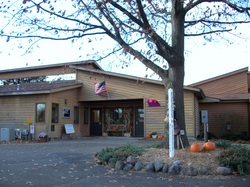

Location
- 5709 Eastman Avenue; Midland, Michigan 48640; United States

Information
- School type: Non-profit, Montessori School
- Established: 1971
- Head of school: Sarah Grachek / Amber Goodeman
- Age: 6 weeks to extended kindergarten
- Enrollment: 73 (May 25th, 2024)
- Accreditation: American Montessori Society
- School Blog: www.mmsmichigan.com
- Website: www.midlandmontessori.org

Midland Montessori School is an American Montessori Society-affiliated nonprofit organization in Midland, Michigan, United States. It is Midland's largest and oldest school that teaches children based on the Montessori philosophy.

The school is run by a board of directors recruited from the parent community along with the school administration. Board members are elected on an annual basis and hold their position for a minimum of one year.

In 2012 the school celebrated its 40th anniversary.

== History ==
- 1970 - The school was founded in Midland by a group of interested parents under the name "Saginaw Valley Montessori Association".
- 1971 - The school opened its doors under the name "Midland Montessori School" in a rented facility.
- 1979 - A new building was constructed on a property owned by the school on Eastman Road and the school subsequently moved to its permanent location. The school began operating in the new building on October 8.
- 1982 - The lower level of the building was finished to accommodate a new classroom.
- 1989 - The facility expanded again and doubled in size.
- 1998 - Two new classrooms were added.
- 2002 - Additional facilities, including a library and a gross motor room were added
- 2004 - An infant/toddler program was introduced. During this year the school transitioned its childcare/preschool combination into an all day Montessori program. New flooring, furniture and accessories were added.
- 2008 - Two new playground structures and a bike path were added, along with an upgrade of the existing garden.
- 2009 - An all year Montessori program was added.

== Facilities ==
The school has seven classrooms, two of which include a child-accessible kitchen. The overall available space is 9,000 square feet on two levels.

Located on the lower level is a large indoor gym and a library with two computers.

Outside are three playground structures with a swing set, a fenced-in grass area, and a bike path.

== Community activities ==
Children are engaged in community activities early on, including parent / student parades, or fund raisers.

== Affiliations ==
- American Montessori Society
- Montessori Administrators Association
- Michigan Montessori Society
- North American Montessori Teachers' Association
