= Oxford Montessori Schools =

Group of independent schools in England

Location
- Oxford, Oxfordshire; England; 51°47′36″N 1°12′46″W

Information
- Type: Independent school
- Established: 1990
- Department for Education URN: 132048 Tables
- Ofsted: Reports
- Gender: Co-educational
- Age: 2 to 16
- Enrolment: 125
- Website: oxfordmontessori.co.uk

Oxford Montessori Schools is a group of progressive, co-educational private schools based in and around Oxford in England. Founded in 1990, the Oxford Montessori Schools group is the largest Montessori organisation in Oxfordshire. The group consists of three schools:

- Forest Farm School – a combined nursery, primary and senior school in Elsfield, Oxfordshire
- Wolvercote Montessori Nursery in Wolvercote, Oxford
- St Giles Montessori Nursery in St Giles', Oxford

The schools emphasise a progressive educational philosophy, inspired by the principles of Montessori education. The most recent Ofsted report rates Forest Farm School as 'good', noting that "pupils enjoy the warm, family atmosphere created by the school" and "achieve well over time owing to good teaching and a broad and balanced curriculum".

Oxford Montessori Schools is a small school with around 80 pupils at the Forest Farm campus, and is a member of the Human Scale Education movement.

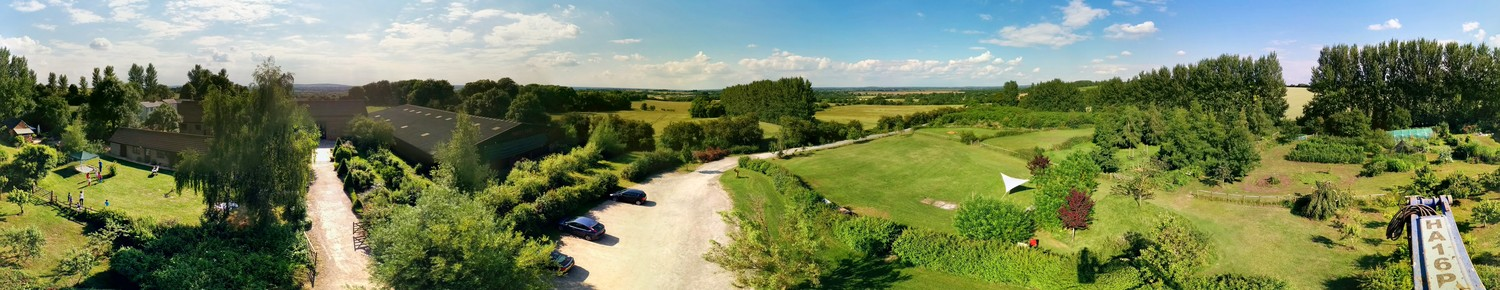
Panoramic view of OMS Forest Farm School grounds
