= Ekya Schools =

- Bengaluru, Karnataka; India

Information
- Type: Private
- Motto: Together as One
- Established: 2010; 16 years ago
- Founder: Dr. Tristha Ramamurthy
- Trust: CMR Jnanadhara
- Grades: K—XII
- Campuses: BTM Layout; Byrathi; ITPL; JP Nagar; NICE Road; Varthur
- Houses: Jal, Bhoomi, Vayu, Agni
- Slogan: Live the Lesson
- Affiliation: CBSE; ICSE; IGCSE; IB
- Website: ekyaschools.com

Ekya Schools is a chain of K-12 private schools based in Bengaluru, in the state of Karnataka, India. The first branch was opened in 2010 and is part of the CMR Group of Institutions. The school motto is 'Together as One'.

== Campuses ==
The school operates out of several branches within Bengaluru. At present, there are six functional campuses:

- Ekya School BTM Layout
- Ekya School Byrathi
- Ekya School ITPL
- Ekya School JP Nagar
- Ekya School NICE Road
- Ekya Nava

A campus in Goa was proposed, which is currently undergoing development. A Sports Performing Arts Recreation Centre (SPARC) is also being constructed as an annex to the JP Nagar campus.

== Curriculum ==
Ekya Schools offers a variety of curricula across its campuses, including ICSE, CBSE, IGCSE, and IB. The Montessori curriculum is followed by Pre-Primary and Kindergarten classes.

The schools promotes extracurricular activities including Design Thinking, Work Exposure Programs, and Outbound Trips. The Physical Education program integrates sports such as football, basketball, and throwball into the school curriculum. They compete in state and national level competitions, such as the Karnataka ICSE School's Association (KISA) and CBSE Zonals.

== Leadership ==
- Founder and Managing Director: Dr. Tristha Ramamurthy

=== Campus heads ===
- BTM Layout: Asha Doris
- Byrathi: Jinu Harikesh Pavithran
- ITPL: Aayushi Kalja
- JP Nagar: Sreepriya Unnikrishnan
- Nava: Payal Sharma
- NICE Road: Rajamathangi Rajasekaran
