= Rhein-Main International Montessori School =

Location
- Hugenottenstraße 119; Hochtaunuskreis; Friedrichsdorf, Hesse, 61381; Germany
- Coordinates: 50.258°N 8.644°E

Information
- School type: Private Kindergarten, primary education, Gymnasium
- Established: 2003
- Closed: 2015
- School number: 5240
- Gender: Coeducational

The Rhein-Main International Montessori School (abbreviation: RIMS) was a private school and one of two secondary schools in Friedrichsdorf, Hesse, Germany. The school included a Kindergarten, primary education and a Gymnasium. This Montessori school, as one of few international Montessori schools, it united the whole spectrum of the Montessori method from the Kindergarten, the primary education to Gymnasium in one building. The school had approximately 47 teachers and 370 students.

== School ==
RIMS consisted of a children's house, an elementary school and a secondary school. A secondary school was introduced in the 2008/2009 school year; however, teaching there was not based on the Montessori method.

The school had never been recognized as an examination-authorized school, so the baccalaureate examinations had to be taken at state schools. In 2014, the school hit the headlines because half of the students had failed the baccalaureate exams. Since the school had also not offered the opportunity to obtain the intermediate school-leaving certificate after the 10th grade, the failed high school graduates were left without any qualifications.
