= Siragu Montessori School =

School in Chennai, India

Logo of Siragu Montessori School

Siragu Montessori School is a school in Chennai, India. It was started in June 2003 to provide free education for homeless and under-privileged children.

== Early history ==
Siragu Montessori School is a unit of Suyam started in June 2003. It was started for children of the Nomadic Tribes (pavement dwellers and mendicants). Traditionally carrying on the practice of begging, this community never had any real opportunities for breaking out of their situation. Siragu was started with the objective of providing education to first generation learners. SIRAGU started not only for street children but also for children from brick chambers.

The school began in locally rented premises. The condition of the building was quite poor (eighty years old, poor upkeep, no roof, vermin infested) but volunteer assistance garnered by Suyam helped make it habitable.

There are now 400 children, 105 of which are inmates of Siragu home. The school has adopted the Montessori method of education. The school has 13 teaching staff and 9 non-teaching staff.

== Nadaipathai Pookkal Program (Flowers of the Pavement) ==
This program is for families having settlements in Palavedu Pettai, but residing in pavements around Kilpauk Water Tank for around 30 years. These families are involved in begging. Since 1999, Siragu adopted these families (initially 50 families) and has provided the community in Kilpauk and Palavedu Pettai with education, medical facilities (including family planning counselling), counselling for de-addiction, child care, and resolution of family problems. Siragu has set up employment schemes and self-help groups.

== Impact ==
The school has nearly stopped begging among children in the Nadaipathai Pookkal community. There are 82 first generation learners, including those from Nadaipathai Pookkal program.

The school provides a six-month bridge course for 50 children from 10 brick kilns in Palavedu Panchayat. The school motivates them to learn, and to join mainstream schools in their villages.

Parents started keeping track of their child's development, and interacted with school staff and management to address child related issues. School has become a priority for the parents, even above their rituals and ceremonies, and the levels of absenteeism has come down.

Siragu provides an education for children who had minimal access to schooling. Siragu as a school for the community, has enabled five families to be self-employed and move away from begging

== Teachers and teachings ==
Teachers are selected from the Palavedu Panchayath community, and then trained. They meet in the school every Saturday for training where they go through reference books (on subjects, activities, child development etc.), and prepare for the next week's activities.

== Administration ==
- Dr. Uma Venkatachalam, Secretary, is in charge of all academic activities.
- Mr. R. N. Muthuram, Administrative Director, is in charge of the school administration and accounts.

== Documentary films ==
- Nadaipathai Pookal - Documentary film by Uma and Muthuram, founders of Siragu
- Wings Of Evolution - Documentary film made 2007
