= Cambridge Montessori School =

Coordinates: 42.3859°N 71.1326°W

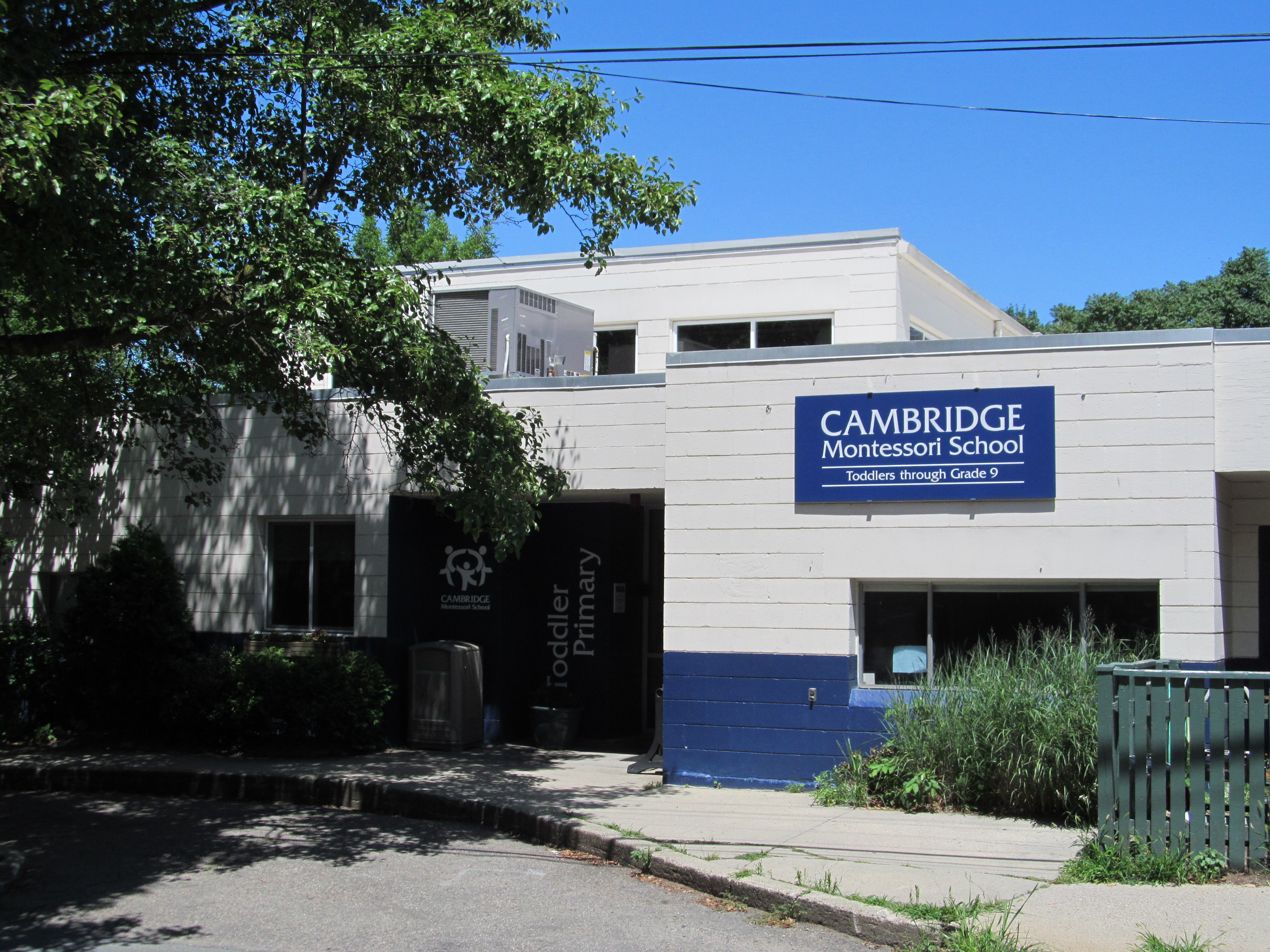

Information
- Established: 1963

Cambridge Montessori School is a private American Montessori Society and Association of Independent Schools of New England certified private Montessori school that was founded in 1963 in Cambridge, Massachusetts. It offers preschool, kindergarten, primary, elementary, and middle school education.

== Campus ==
As of 2012, Cambridge Montessori School has grown to 221 students with three distinct campuses. Since 1974, CMS's Toddler/Primary Program (21months through Kindergarten) has been situated at 161 Garden Street in Cambridge, adjacent to Danehy Park. CMS added the Elementary Building (grades 1–6) at 129 Sherman St. in 1997. In 2008, the School rented 5,000 additional square feet in the Brickyard Office Park, midway between its existing buildings, for additional office, studio, and classroom space for arts and the Middle School. In 2014, the brickyard space was further expanded and now houses 5 additional administrative offices and a conference room.

== Programs ==
- Toddler Program - For children 21 months through age 3. Activities are changed regularly in response to children's need for variety and challenge.
- Primary Program - The Primary program is for children from 3 to 6 years. It is a mixed-age environment where children spend three years in the same classroom.
- Elementary Program - For students 6 to 12 years old, is organized as two three-year cycles: Lower Elementary for 6- to 9-year-old students and Upper Elementary for 9- to 12-year-old students.
- Middle School Program - For students 12 to 14 years old. It includes a two-year interdisciplinary curriculum inside and outside of the classroom.
- Passport Program - Includes Early Care, After School Care, Clubs, Athletics and Camps (Summer and School vacation).

== Tuition ==
Tuition for the 2023-2024 academic year ranges from $27,310 for toddlers, to $40,500 for middle school students.

== Faculty and staff ==
- Interim Head of School - Susan Morrissey
- 15 full and part-time admin and support staff
- 45 full and part-time teachers

== See also ==
Cambridge, Massachusetts#Primary and secondary private education
