= Montessori School of Louisville =

Coordinates: 38°17′46.3″N 85°33′50.5″W

Montessori School of Louisville, Inc

Location
- 10263 Champion Farms Dr. Louisville, KY 40241

Information
- Website: https://www.msl-edu.org/

Montessori School of Louisville, Inc (MSL) is a private, independent, non-profit school in Louisville, Kentucky. MSL is the only Montessori School in Louisville serving children from early childhood age through middle school. The school was formed by Montessori parents and educators in 2006 to provide Montessori middle school education in the Louisville area. The school relocated in 2009 to eastern Jefferson County in Springhurst Professional Plaza at 10263 Champion Farms Drive. In 2010, Montessori School of Louisville was recommended for accreditation by Southern Association of Colleges and Schools (SACS).
