= Richard H. Mitchell House =

Historic house in Ohio, United States

- U.S. National Register of Historic Places
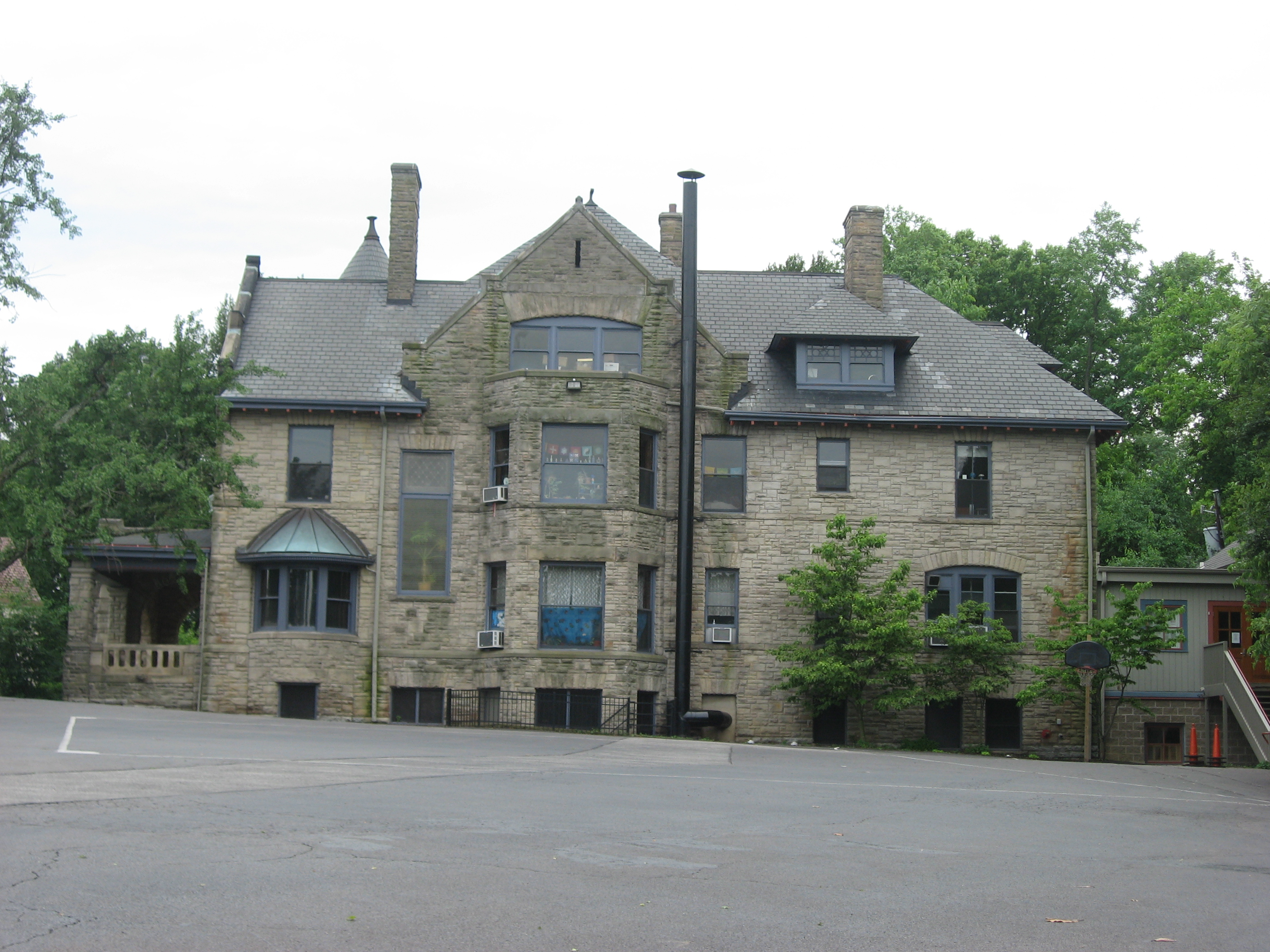
- Northeastern side of the house

- Location within Ohio Location within the United States
- Interactive map showing the location of Richard A. Miller House
- Location: 3 Burton Woods Lane, Cincinnati, Ohio
- Coordinates: 39°9′21″N 84°29′11″W
- Area: 1 acre (0.40 ha)
- Built: 1892
- Architect: Samuel Hannaford
- MPS: Samuel Hannaford and Sons TR in Hamilton County
- NRHP reference No.: 80003065
- Added to NRHP: March 3, 1980

The Richard H. Mitchell House is a historic residence in Cincinnati, Ohio, United States. Built of stone throughout, this large house was designed by prominent Cincinnati architect Samuel Hannaford. Converted into a school, the house has been named a historic site.

== History ==
Robert Mitchell was born in Ireland and immigrated to the United States in 1824. After founding a furniture company in Cincinnati in 1836, he built his business into a prosperous firm, and by the 1890s, he was wealthy enough to build the present house as a gift for his son Richard. Constructed in 1892, the house was home to the Mitchell family for forty years. When the family left, the building was acquired by St. Thomas Aquinas Catholic Church, which converted it into premises for the parish school. The parish remained in the former house into the 1970s. Since that time, the Mitchell House has become the location of a different school, The New School Montessori.

Richard Mitchell employed Samuel Hannaford as the architect for the house. Popular among wealthy Gilded Age Cincinnatians, Hannaford was the most significant of the city's nineteenth-century architects. He was willing to employ numerous architectural styles, producing buildings in such styles as the Romanesque Revival, the Queen Anne, and the Neo-Renaissance. Other Hannaford structures combined elements of different styles in an eclectic manner, including the Mitchell House. Mitchell's residence was one of his later works, built just five years before the end of his decades-long career.

== Architecture ==
Two and a half stories tall, the Mitchell House is built of stone throughout, with large ashlar blocks employed for the walls. Limestone walls rest on a stone foundation, and the roof is slate. Among the leading components of the design are a prominent porch and turret, located at the center of the facade and on one corner of the facade respectively. Although the dormer-pierced turret roof rises to a conical peak, other parts of the house are capped by gabled roofs; the gables themselves form a leading component of the design. Below one of the gables, the porch is distinguished by grand arches and a stone balustrade surrounding the roof.

== Preservation ==
In 1980, the Richard H. Mitchell House was among dozens of Hannaford-designed buildings in Hamilton County listed together on the National Register of Historic Places as a multiple property submission. Like most of the other buildings in the group, the Mitchell House qualified for the Register because of its well-preserved historic architecture.
