= Beechworth Secondary College =

School in Beechworth, Victoria, Australia

Coordinates: 36°20′52.4″S 146°41′24.6″E

- Beechworth, Victoria; Australia

Information
- School type: Public, co-educational, secondary, day school
- Principal: Patricia Broom
- Grades: 7–12
- Enrolment: ~250
- Colours: Green, black and white
- Website: www.bworthsc.vic.edu.au/

Beechworth Secondary College is a state secondary college located in the historic town of Beechworth, Victoria, which is located in the north east of the state near the border of Victoria and New South Wales.

== About the school ==
Beechworth Secondary College is a small secondary school of around 250 students set in spacious grounds in one of Victoria's historic and well-preserved gold rush towns.

The College has a mainstream 7–12 program.

Curriculum offerings in the mainstream program consists of core components covering the Key Learning Areas and Individual learning Programs as needed. Year 7 & 9 students have extended programs through the Outdoor School at Bogong, including the extended journey opportunity in the High Plains through Future Makers for all year 9 students.

Students are also able to select a flexible program from Vocational Education and Training (VETiS) and Victorian Certificate of Education (VCE) subjects.

The Montessori Adolescent Program (MAP) course of study has been discontinued as of 2025 due to the departure of teachers with the necessary experience. After this another program for years 7-8 named LINK was created, however this was disbanded in mid-2025. The MAP program was a mixed age class (Year 7–9), flexible, innovative and responsive to individual needs. The program was guided by the Montessori National Curriculum and Aus VELS expectations in the interdisciplinary themes. It included study skills and strategies, personal learning plans, mastery, coaching and exploratory activities, individual, small-group, and whole-group learning experiences. The MAP at BSC offered an opportunity for adolescents to learn in an environment that provides real life experiences and work practice that brings the curriculum to life.

Beechworth Secondary College core curriculum language focus on the study of French, with students also accessing additional languages through the VSL-Victorian School of Languages. The school makes links with Asian schools with homestay students from Japan. The College has a wide range of extra-curricular activities including STEM Maker space, instrumental and class music, an annual musical production, a wide range of excursions, competitions, theatre visits, visiting performances, sports program, snow sports program and camps. Students can also apply for positions in year 9 at the Alpine School for Leadership.

Support services for students include a literacy and learning support programs.

Special facilities include a new building incorporating science, computer rooms, Library and general classrooms a gymnasium, smaller senior classes. The school offers special programs including school productions, an extensive snow sports program, year level and subject based camps, overseas trips, Outdoor Education and many other school excursions around the local area and Victoria.

Since 2017 the current principal is Patricia Broom.

== History ==
The school is undergoing a building program which will ultimately see the entire school rebuilt.
