= Implicit Shape Model =

Technique in computer vision

An Implicit Shape Model for a given object category consists of a class-specific alphabet (codebook) of local appearances that are prototypical for the object category, and of a spatial probability distribution which specifies where each codebook entry may be found on the object.
