= Thacher Montessori School =

Coordinates: 42.2226°N 71.1192°W

- Thacher Montessori School
- Milton, MA; USA

Information
- Type: Independent
- Established: 1971
- Head of School: Deba Dunn
- Faculty: 40
- Enrollment: 140
- Tuition: $13,600 - 23,400 (2020-21)
- Website: http://www.thacherschool.org/

Thacher Montessori School is an independent day school located in Milton, Massachusetts for toddlers through 8th graders. Thacher Montessori is accredited by the Association of Independent Schools of New England.

== History ==
Thacher Montessori School was founded in 1971 in a single classroom by Maureen Coughlan. Her vision for a school dedicated to true Montessori principles resulted in steady growth. With support from her diverse and committed community of families and a growing student population, Thacher moved into its current home at 1425 Blue Hill Avenue in 1989. The building was designed to be a Montessori learning environment with easy access to the outdoors, plenty of natural light and a floor plan well-suited for children. In spring 2008, Thacher began construction to add a second floor to the building. This project was completed in fall 2008.

In 2008, Thacher attained a classic Montessori structure of four Children's House, three Lower Elementary, two Upper Elementary and one Adolescent Program classrooms. A toddler program was also added.

Thacher students using Montessori materials.
