= Modern Montessori School =

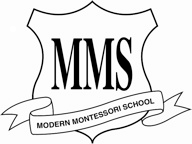
- Amman; Jordan

Information
- Type: Private school
- Established: 1985
- Chairman: Randa Al Hasan
- Director: Zaid Khasawneh
- Campus: 24,000 square meters
- Website: www.mms.edu.jo

The Modern Montessori School (MMS) is a private school in Amman, Jordan founded by Randa Amin Hasan. It caters to students from 3–18 years old, and is affiliated with the International Baccalaureate and accredited by the International Centre for Montessori Education (ICME). It was established in 1985 and is built on a 24,000 m2 piece of land. The school’s mission and vision focuses on 5 pillars: Academics, Creative Arts (Performing and Visual), Athletics and Extra-curricular, culminating in a focus of well-roundedness and character development.

It offers a Montessori Early Childhood Education Programme from Nursery to Kindergarten (Ages 3-5); bilingual English/Arabic curriculum of the PYP (Primary Years Program) for Primary School, the MYP (Middle Years Program) for grades 6-10 and finally the IB diploma for grades 11 and 12, making it one of less than a handful of schools that offer the full IB-continuum and the only school in the region that combines Montessori for early years with the IB-continuum. It obtained full accreditation from the Council for International Schools (CIS) in 2023. The MMS joined the Inspired Group of Elite Schools in 2025.
