= ISM (album) =

Studio album by Savant
- Released: 9 September 2012
- Recorded: 2012
- Genre: Complextro, dubstep, electro, house, drumstep, drum and bass, chiptune, glitch hop
- Length: 59:54 (Initial Release); 1:05:28 (Third Anniversary Edition); 1:13:10 (Fourth Anniversary Edition)
- Label: Section Z
- Producer: Savant

Savant chronology
Overworld (2012)	ISM (2012)	Alchemist (2012)

Fourth anniversary CD cover
- Redrawn cover released for the fourth anniversary of "ISM"

ISM is the twenty-fourth album by the Norwegian electronic dance music producer Aleksander Vinter, and his fourth using the alias "Savant". It was released on 9 September 2012.

For the third anniversary of its release (9 September 2015), Vinter released his own remix of the popular track "Starfish" under the alias of his side project, "Blanco". This track is only available through Bandcamp and Vinter has not announced any plans for a release elsewhere, and despite being considered part of ISM, this track is not included when purchasing SAVANT COMPLETE, Savant's full discography.

For its fourth anniversary (9 September 2016), 750 limited edition CDs were sold with both signed and unsigned versions. These CDs included updated cover art, and a bonus track made for the anniversary, "ISM Orchestral Suite"; an orchestral suite of many tracks on the album, including "Prelude", "Zeitgeist", "8-Bit Lightsaber", "Outfox", "Starfish", and "ISM". This track is also available on the digital Bandcamp release.

== Track listing ==
1. "Prelude" – 6:26
2. "The Beat" - 4:05
3. "Nightmare Adventures" – 3:29
4. "Ghetto Blastah" - 3:45
5. "Syko" (feat. Twistex) - 5:05
6. "Starfish" - 5:01
7. "Zeitgeist" - 4:23
8. "8-Bit Lightsaber" - 4:26
9. "Mystery" - 5:08
10. "Outfox" - 5:34
11. "No Shit Sherlock" - 3:43
12. "Cry For Love" - 5:10
13. "ISM" - 5:25
14. "Starfish (Blanco Remix)" (only on anniversary edition) - 5:34
15. "ISM Orchestral Suite" (only on Bandcamp 2016 4 year anniversary edition) - 7:42

== Reviews ==
YourEDM spoke favourably of the album, stating that 'ISM is a glimpse into the mind of an extremely talented producer. Never to be confined by just one genre, ISM spans the boundaries of electronic music and reveals just how talented this young producer really is.'
