= The Children's School =

Independent school that teaches by the Montessori method in Stamford, Connecticut

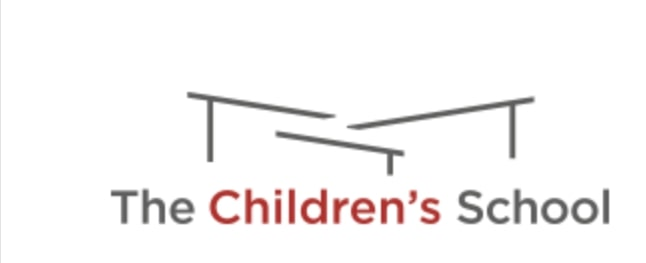

Location
- 118 Scofieldtown Road; Stamford, CT 06903; 41°07′22.5″N 73°32′55.3″W

Information
- School type: Independent; Montessori
- Established: January 30, 1965
- Founder: Margaret Skutch
- Head of school: Maureen Murphy
- Grades: pre-K to Grade 3.
- Enrollment: 130
- Campus size: 32 Acres
- Accreditation: NAIS, CAIS
- Website: www.childrensschool.org

The Children’s School is an independent, Montessori-inspired primary school in Stamford, Connecticut. It was founded in 1965 and is accredited by the Connecticut Association of Independent Schools (Pre-K to Grade 3) and the National Association of Independent Schools. The head of school is Maureen Murphy.

== History ==
The school was founded in 1965 as the Montessori School of Stamford in the basement of a local church. The founding of the Montessori-based school was influenced by her son's experience in a nearby Montessori school, which she discovered while looking for a place to begin the education of her child.

In 1966, the Educational Facilities Laboratories awarded the school a $4,000 grant towards any costs associated with the planning of a dedicated school building. A year later, as the school opened its doors, its name was changed to the Early Learning Center. The design of the new school building was the subject of a documentary filmed by the EFL itself.

In 1968, a film from the Ford Foundation was released to the public documenting the school's teaching methods. Then, in 2007, the school opened as one of Connecticut's first LEED-certified green buildings. It was designed to have two large classrooms in which students are able to focus and concentrate effectively.

== Notable alumni ==
- Jen Psaki, 34th White House Press Secretary
- Alexandra Truwit, American Paralympic swimmer in the 2024 Summer Paralympics
