= Town Centre Private Schools =

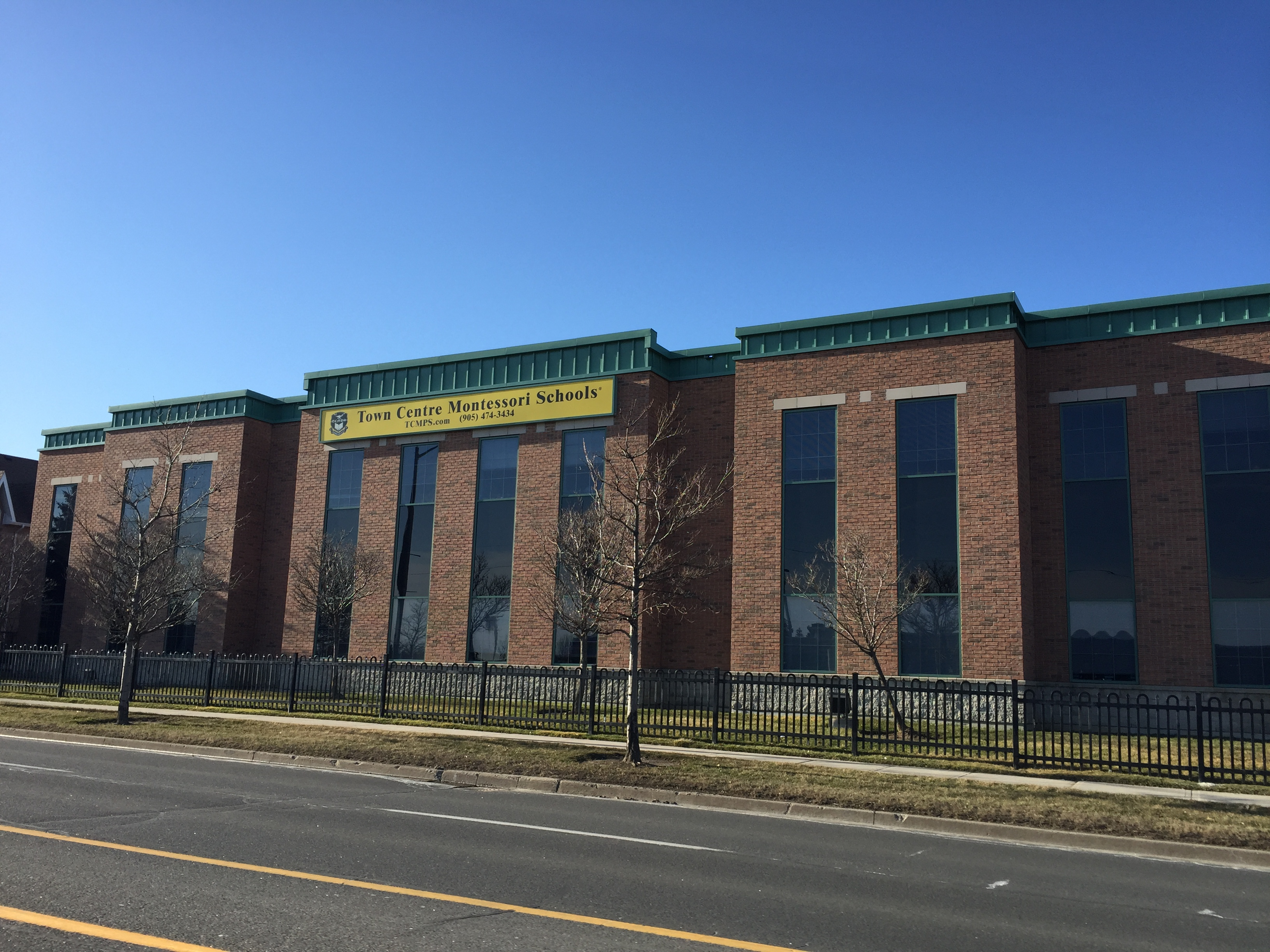
- Amarillo campus

Location
- 155 Clayton Drive (Main campus); Markham, Ontario, L3R 7P3 (Main campus); 43°49′55″N 79°18′35″W

Information
- School type: Private
- Founded: 1986
- Principal: Rocco Lamanna (Elementary) Leepy Hajra (High School)
- Grades: Preschool; 1–12
- Enrollment: c. 1,000: c. 60 (Pre-school); 600 (Elementary); 200 (High)
- Language: English
- Colours: Black, blue and white
- Mascot: TC the Tiger
- Tuition: c. $8,000 (Pre-school) to; c. $22,210 (Elementary & High)
- Website: tcmps.com

Town Centre Private Schools (TCPS) is a private, co-educational, IB world school in Markham, Ontario, founded in 1986. Students from preschool to grade 12 are accepted. There are three campuses: the Amarillo campus teaches students from 18 months to 6 years old using the Montessori method; the main campus, which teaches Grades 2–12; and the Milliken campus, which teaches ESL Grades 9–12.

== Educational programs ==
The core subjects of English, Mathematics, Science, History and Geography are taught to students in grades one through six by their regular classroom teachers. Students in grades six, seven and eight (Grade six rotary teaching schedule added in the year 2019) have a rotary teaching schedule, with specialist teachers in Mathematics, Language, Science, History and Geography. Students in grades one through eight have specialist teachers for Computer Studies, Physical Education, French and Music/Band.

=== Extended hours ===
After-school programs include, but are not limited to, choir, badminton, ballet, hip hop, pottery, art, computer club, tae-kwon-do, Robotics, 3D printing, chess and piano.

=== Summer programs ===
From July to August summer programs are offered. A French camp was added in 2019. The activities in these programs include field trips, sports, and other activities. Swimming is available once weekly.
