= Inner Sydney Montessori School =

Location
- Balmain, Sydney, New South Wales; Australia; 33°51′46″S 151°10′40″E

Information
- Type: Independent Montessori coeducational early learning and primary day school
- Motto: Be immersed. Be inspired. Be yourself
- Denomination: Nonsectarian
- Established: 1981; 45 years ago
- Educational authority: New South Wales Department of Education
- Oversight: Montessori Australia Foundation
- Years: Early learning; K-6
- Campuses: 1
- Website: www.isms.nsw.edu.au

The Inner Sydney Montessori School (abbreviated as ISMS) is an independent nonsectarian Montessori coeducational early learning and primary day school, located in Balmain, Sydney, New South Wales, Australia.

The school was founded in Annandale in 1981.

== See also ==
- List of non-government schools in New South Wales
- List of Montessori schools
