= Montessori Middle School =

Montessori school in Louisville, Tennessee

Coordinates: 35.8516°N 83.9601°W

Montessori Middle School was a Montessori school, grades 5 through 8, located in Louisville, Tennessee. The facility was built in 2008 on a rural property once a cattle farm. It was the first Montessori school for adolescents in East Tennessee and one of the first in the Southeast.
