= Blake School (Plantation, Florida) =

Private school in Florida, United States

Coordinates: 26.1495°N 80.2453°W

Location
- 7011 West Sunrise Blvd; Plantation, Florida 33313; United States

Information
- School type: Private school
- Grades: Preschool - Grade 8
- Gender: Mixed
- Website: https://www.blake-school.org/

The Blake School is a private, co-ed Montessori school serving pre-school through 8th grade. The school is located in Plantation, Florida, United States. This school is associated with The Blake School (Lake City, Florida).
