= Savant (musician) =

Norwegian musician

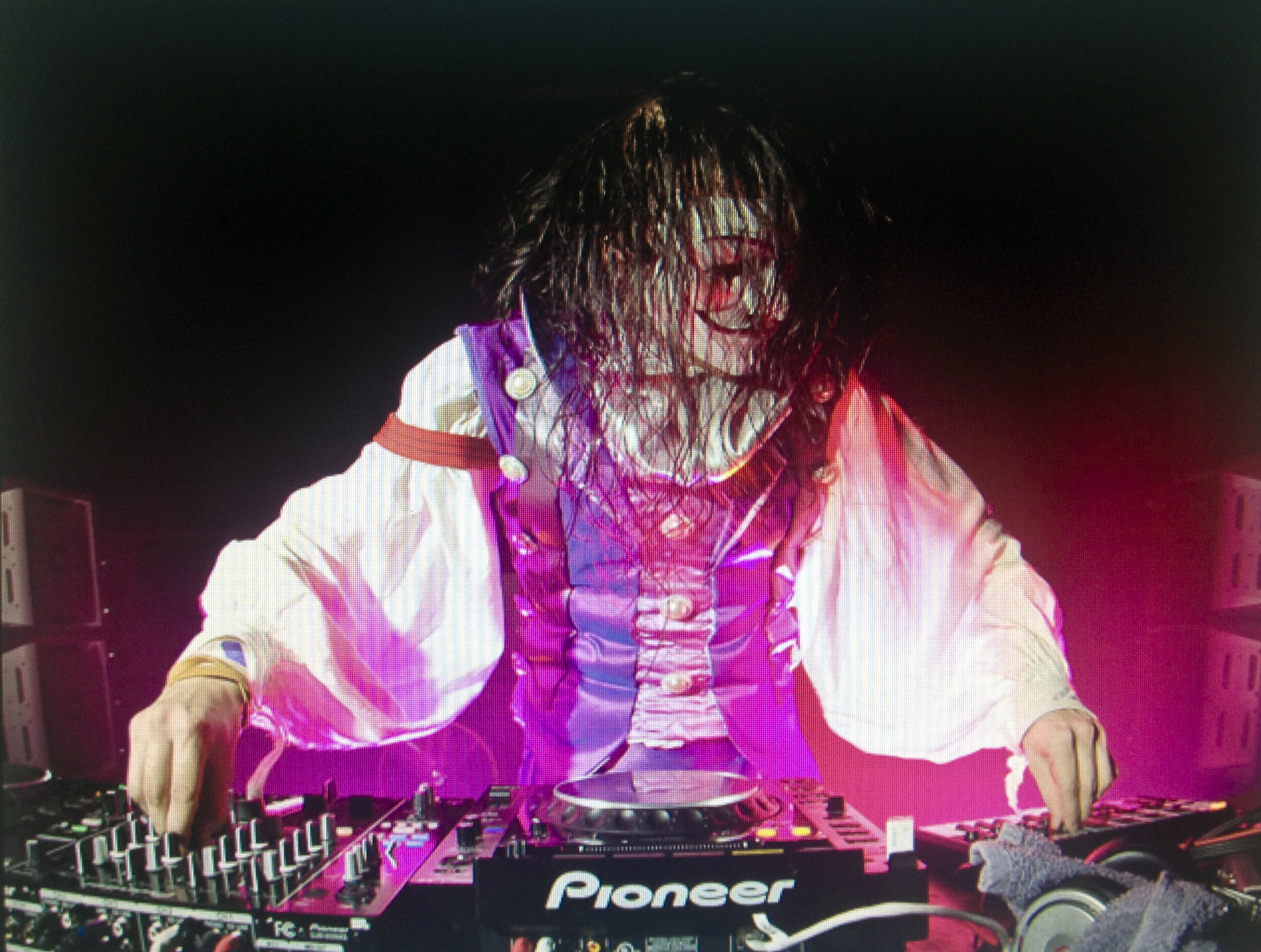
- Savant performing in 2014

Background information
- Also known as: Savant, Vinter, Datakrash, Blanco, Vinter in Hollywood
- Born: Aleksander Vinter
- Origin: Oslo, Norway
- Genres: Electronic, EDM, experimental, dubstep, complextro
- Occupations: Musician, singer, songwriter, performer
- Years active: 2007–present
- Labels: SectionZ, Vybz
- Website: vinter.us

Aleksander Vinter is a Norwegian musician. He has released a vast amount of work under numerous aliases but is best known for his work under the alias Savant.

== Career ==
In 2009, Vinter released his debut album, Outbreak, under the moniker Vinter in Hollywood. Outbreak was nominated in the electronic music category for the 2009 Norwegian Grammy Awards.

Vinter signed with SectionZ Records in 2010 and put out a second album, Mamachine, this time billed as Vinter in Vegas. In 2011, he released Ninür under the moniker Savant.

In 2013, his following increased as he embarked on two North American tours. Between tours, he released the album Cult and provided music for the D-Pad Studio game Savant - Ascent. Orakel was released on December 11, 2013.

In 2014, Savant released Protos. Later that year, on December 13, ZION was released reaching No. 19 on the Billboard Dance chart and No. 24 on the Billboard Heatseekers chart.

His album Invasion was released in January 2015, and led deadmau5 to call Savant "the change that electronic dance music needs".

In 2016, he released multiple singles, including "Cassette", a seven-track album with one single being played in different genres, and "Get It Get It", a hip-hop collab with DMX and Snoop Dogg. On July 15, he released Vybz, which reached No. 16 on the Billboard Dance/Electronic charts. On October 21, he released Outcasts, a 4-CD collection of remastered unreleased demos and singles.

In 2017, he debuted an orchestral soundtrack for the film The Black Room. On April 17, he released Jester. A re-mastered version of Jester was released on April 1 the following year.

In 2018, he released Highlander, an album of Celtic and orchestral music on March 30, and Calypso, an album under the Blanco alias on August 31. A Halloween-themed album, Slasher, was released on October 26 after Vinter conceptualized and finished the album in just over two weeks. On June 6, 2019, the album Mortals was released.

On April 4, 2020, Void was released. This album was a year-long project whose release was commemorated with a Reddit AMA.

On February 2, 2022, Krang was released. On December 11, 2022, Alchemist 2 was released. This album is a revisit of the 2012 album titled Alchemist.

== Radio ==
In 2016, the singles "Fire", "Forsaken" and "Cassette" debuted in CMJ's Top 10 RPM Adds chart.

Radio Statistics for Savant Singles
| Track | CMJ Add Chart Position | Total Adds | Confirmed Total Airplay Stations | CMJ Chart Debut | Total CMJ Chart Appearances |
|---|---|---|---|---|---|
| "Cassette" | 4 | 65 | 36 | 26 | 11 |
| "Fire" | 3 | 70 | 49 | 38 | 12 |
| "Forsaken" | 2 | 100 | 60 | 24 | 16 |

== Blanco ==
Blanco started as a small side project of Savant in October 2010. One Blanco EP, The Mother of God and a Filthy Whore, was released.

Around mid-2015, Vinter returned to the "Blanco" alias. Vinter announced that what was originally planned to be a single EP will actually be released as a trilogy of EPs, each with six tracks. The first of these EPs, Bajo, included three singles.

In October 2015, Vinter announced that Savant would no longer be releasing EDM-style music and that, from that point on, Blanco would release any EDM-style tracks.

== Personal life ==
In his press kit, Vinter is described as having Asperger syndrome. Within his 2014 Artists biographical profile, he is described as having "struggled in school and life until he was diagnosed with a series of mental conditions -- primarily Asperger's Syndrome."

== Video games ==
An official video game titled Savant - Ascent was launched on December 4, 2013. It was developed by D-Pad Studio, created in Game Maker for iOS, Android, Microsoft Windows, macOS, and Linux platforms, and the soundtrack to the game became Savant's first video game album. In 2023, a remake of the original game was released featuring a 4 disc original soundtrack and sound design by Vinter.
