= Tim Seldin =

- Born: June 16, 1946 (age 80); Washington DC, U.S.
- Education: Georgetown University
- Occupations: Educator; author
- Known for: President, Montessori Foundation; Chair, International Montessori Council
- Spouse: Joyce St. Giermaine

Tim Seldin (born June 16, 1946) is a 20th-century American author and educator. Seldin has served as the president of The Montessori Foundation and as chair of The International Montessori Council.

== Career ==
Seldin has more than forty years of experience in Montessori education including twenty-two years as headmaster of the Barrie School in Silver Spring, Maryland, which he attended through high school graduation. He has served as the Director of the Institute for Advanced Montessori Studies, as headmaster and currently as executive director of the New Gate School in Sarasota, Florida.

Seldin is the author of several books including How To Raise An Amazing Child the Montessori Way, The World In The Palm of Her Hand, The Montessori Way with Dr. Paul Epstein, Montessori 101, and Montessori For Every Family with Lorna McGrath. Seldin conducts weekly webinars about Montessori education.

== Personal life ==
Seldin is married to Joyce St. Giermaine.
