= Two Sicilies (disambiguation) =

The Kingdom of the Two Sicilies is a historic country, including the ancient territories of the Kingdom of Naples and the Kingdom of Sicily.

Two Sicilies may also refer to:

- Southern Italy, also known as the region of Two Sicilies (translation of the geographical expression Utriusque Siciliae), approximately comprising the territories of the historic Kingdom
- a title of the House of Bourbon
- the Two Sicilies independence movement
- the Two Sicilies national football team
