= Joosten =

Joosten (Dutch: [ˈjoːstən]) is a Dutch and German patronymic surname, meaning "son of Joost". Notable people with the surname include:

- Albert Joosten (1914–1980), Dutch Montessori teacher
- Astrid Joosten (born 1958), Dutch television personality
- Jan Joosten van Lodensteijn (c. 1560–1623), Dutch sailor, one of the first Dutchmen in Japan
- Jan Joosten (biblical scholar) (born 1959), Belgian professor of the Old Testament
- Julie Joosten (born 1980), American-Canadian poet
- Kathryn Joosten (1939–2012), American television actress
- Patrick Joosten (born 1996), Dutch footballer
- Stefanie Joosten (born 1988), Dutch model, singer and actress

Joostens

- Ángela Joostens (1872–1940), Argentinian with Belgian citizenship after whom the Argentine city of Villa Ángela has been named
- Maurice Joostens (1862–1910), Belgian diplomat
