= Montessori education =

Teaching method encouraging autodidacticism

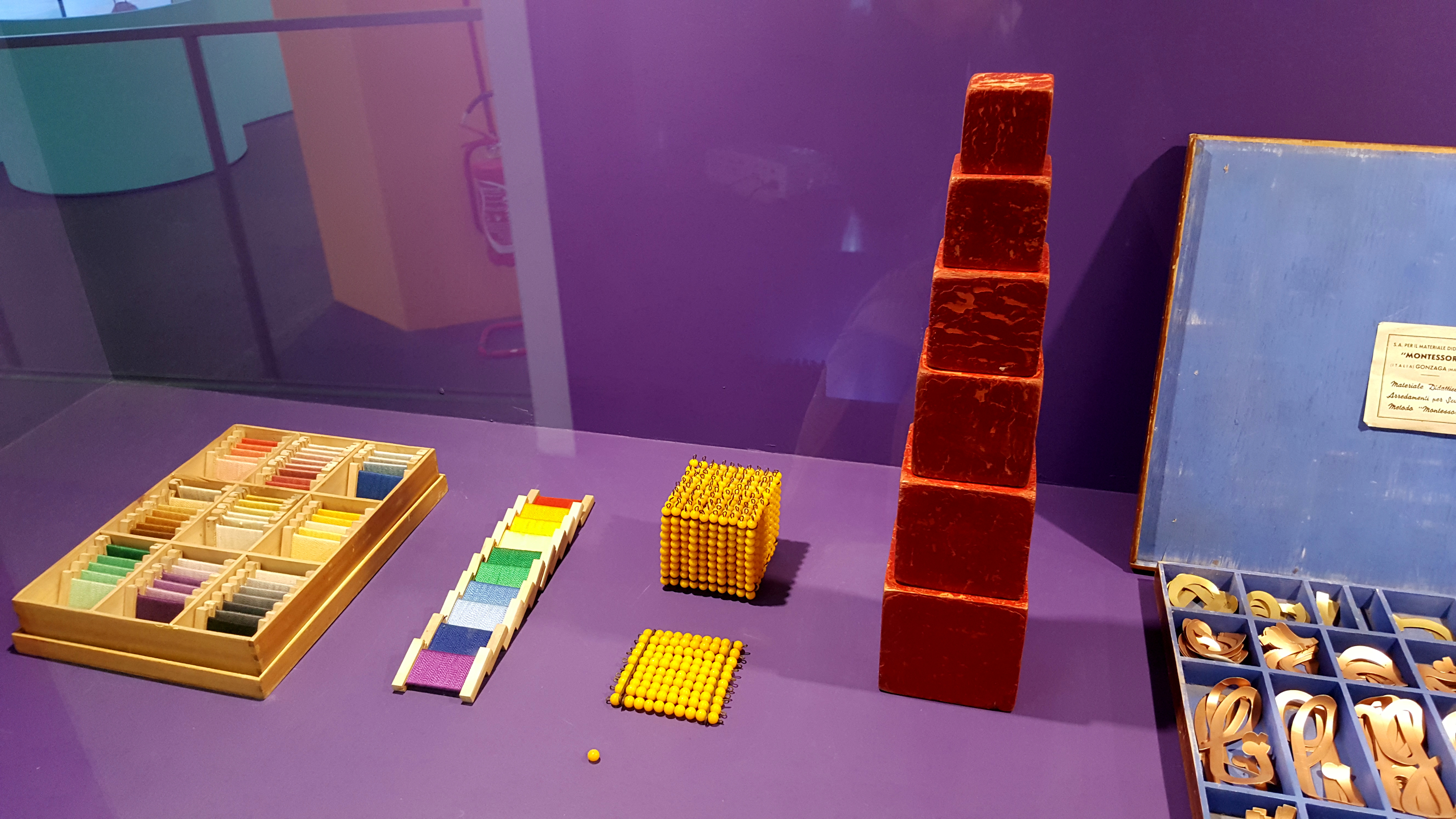
Traditional Montessori educational materials on display at the exhibition "Designed for children" at Triennale di Milano, Milan

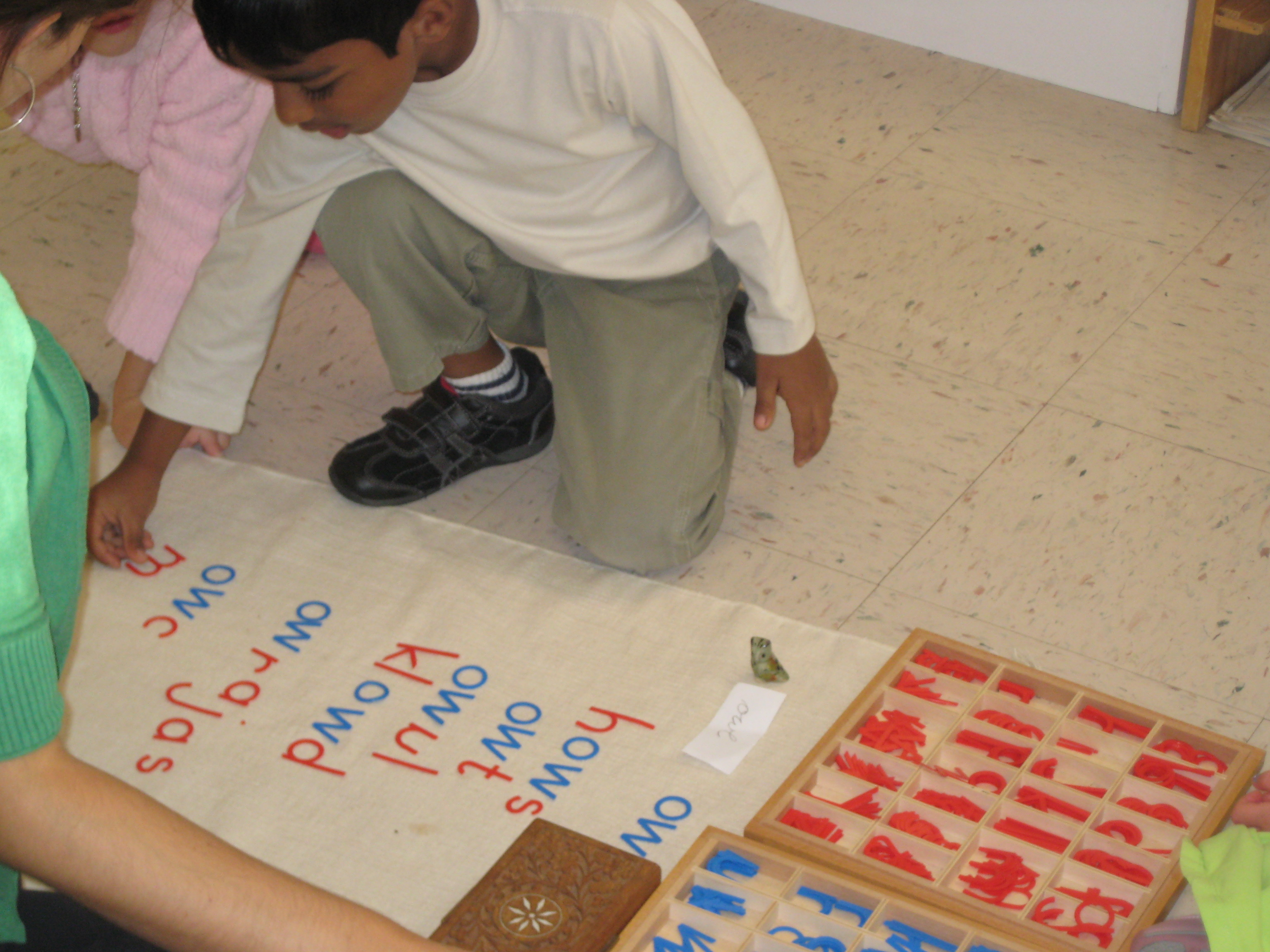
Children working with a moveable alphabet at a Montessori school

The Montessori method of education (/ˌmɒntɪˈsɔːri/ MON-tiss-OR-ee) is a type of educational method that encourages children's natural interests and activities rather than formal teaching methods. A Montessori classroom places an emphasis on hands-on learning and developing real-world skills, such as problem solving and helping and teaching each other. It emphasizes independence and it views children as naturally eager for knowledge and capable of initiating learning in a sufficiently supportive and well-prepared learning environment. It also discourages some conventional methods of measuring achievement, such as grades and tests.

The method was started in the 20th century by Italian physician Maria Montessori, who developed her theories through scientific experimentation with children in many different situations. The method has since been used in many parts of the world, in public and private schools.

A range of practices, schools, and materials exists under the name "Montessori", which is not trademarked. Popular elements include mixed-age classrooms, student autonomy (including their choice of learning topics), long blocks of uninterrupted work time, specially trained teachers, and a prepared environment. Scientific studies regarding the Montessori method report generally favorable outcomes for students.

== History ==
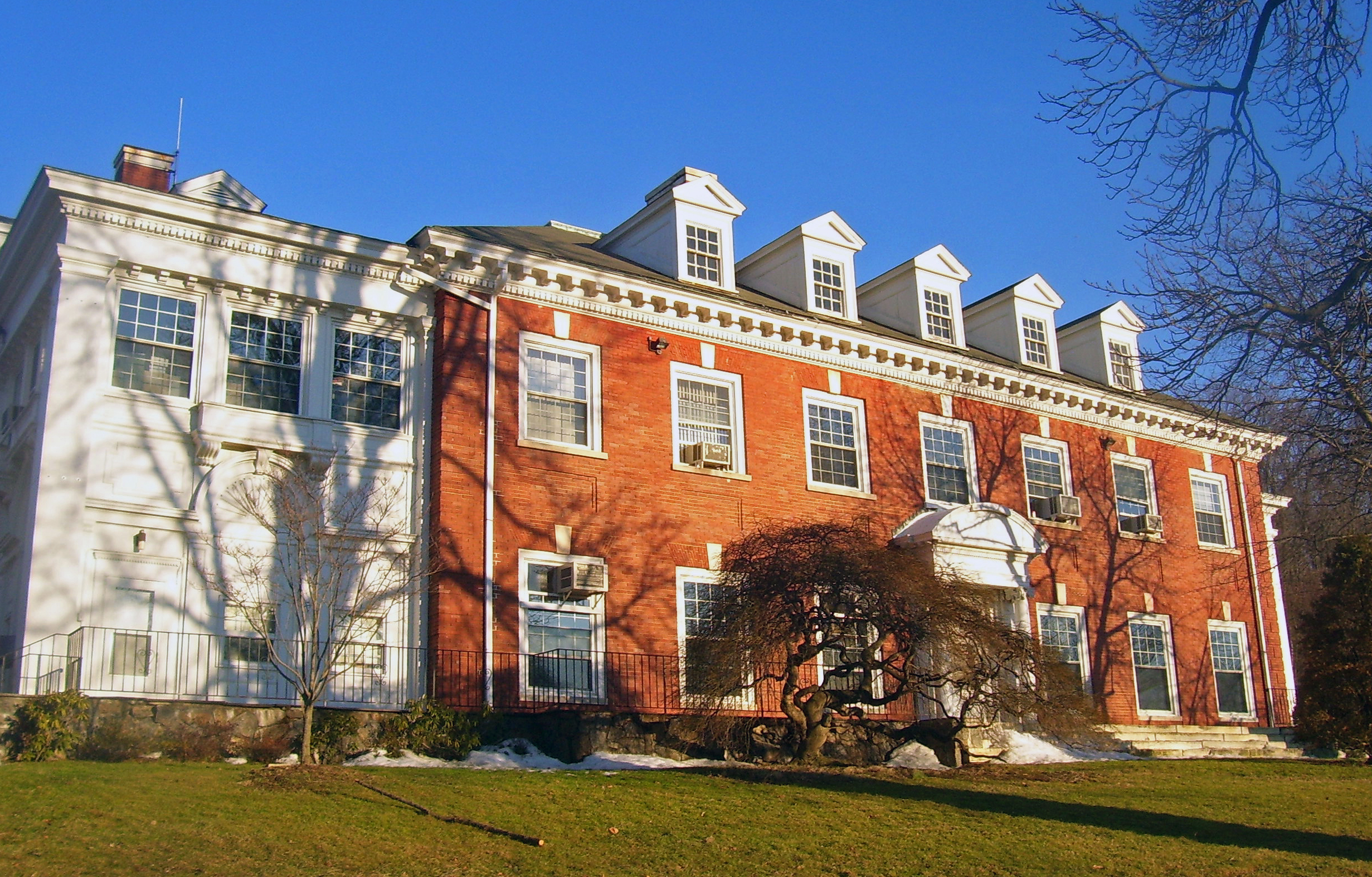
The Scarborough School at the Edward Harden Mansion in Sleepy Hollow, New York, listed on the National Register of Historic Places as the site of the first American Montessori school in 1911

Children eating lunch at their Montessori school in the United Kingdom, c. 1917–1918

Maria Montessori initially resisted a career in teaching, one of only a few professions open to women in that time period. She became one of the first women to become a medical doctor in Italy in the 19th century, and specialized in psychiatry and pediatrics. Maria Montessori began developing her educational philosophy and methods in 1897, attending courses in pedagogy at the University of Rome and learning educational theory. While visiting Rome's mental asylums during her schooling with a teacher, Montessori observed that confined children were in need of more stimulation from their environment. In 1907, she opened her first classroom, the Casa dei Bambini, or Children's House, in a tenement building in the San Lorenzo district of Rome. From the beginning, Montessori based her work on her observations of children and experimentation with the environment, materials, and lessons available to them. The Children's House was established to serve underprivileged children who many thought were unable to learn. She frequently referred to her work as "scientific pedagogy."

In 1901, Maria Montessori met the prominent education reformers Alice and Leopoldo Franchetti. Maria Montessori was invited to hold her first course for teachers and to set up a "Casa dei Bambini" at Villa Montesca, the home of the Franchettis in Città di Castello. Montessori lived with the Franchettis for two years and refined her methodology together with Alice Franchetti. In 1909, she documented her theories in Il metodo della pedagogia scientifica (later translated into English as The Montessori Method in 1912).

Montessori education had spread to the United States by 1912 and became widely known in educational and popular publications. In 1913 Narcissa Cox Vanderlip and Frank A. Vanderlip founded the Scarborough School, the first Montessori school in the U.S. However, conflict arose between Montessori and the American educational establishment. The 1914 critical booklet The Montessori System Examined by influential education teacher William Heard Kilpatrick limited the spread of Montessori's ideas, and they languished after 1914. "Montessori" schools and teacher training centers proliferated and, because of a desire to reach more children, became less and less like the successful examples. Montessori education returned to the United States in 1960 and has since spread to thousands of schools there. Montessori continued to extend her work during her lifetime, developing a comprehensive model of psychological development from birth to age 24, as well as educational approaches for children ages 0 to 3, 3 to 6, and 6 to 12.

Montessori education also spread throughout the world, including Southeast Asia and India, where Maria Montessori was interned during World War II. In October 1931, Indian independence leader Mahatma Gandhi met with Maria Montessori in London. At the time, Gandhi was very interested in the role the Montessori method might play in helping to build an independent nation. Thus, initially, Montessori education in India was connected to the Indian independence movement. Later, elite, private Montessori schools also arose, and in the 1950s, some Montessori schools opened to serve children from lower-socioeconomic families, a trend that continues today with foundation and government-funded schools.

== Methods ==
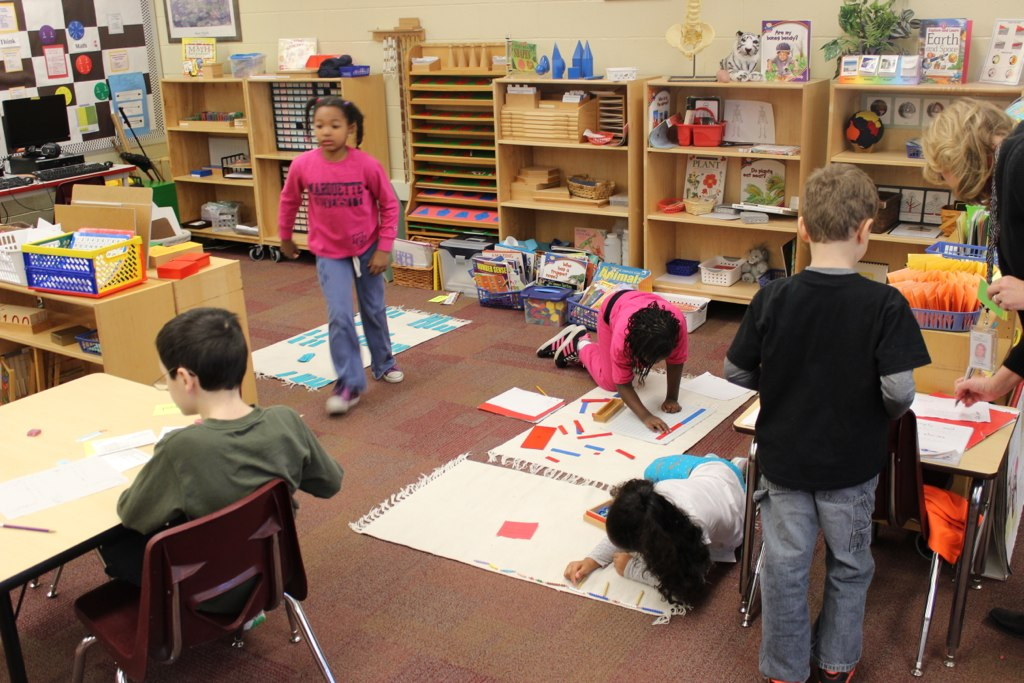
A Montessori classroom in the United States

Montessori education is based on a model of human development. This educational style operates abiding by two beliefs: that psychological self-construction in children and developing adults occurs through environmental interactions, and that children (especially under the age of six) have an innate path of psychological development. Based on her observations, Montessori believed that children who are at liberty to choose and act freely within an environment prepared according to her model would act spontaneously for optimal development.

Although a range of practices exists under the "Montessori" name, the Association Montessori Internationale (AMI) and the American Montessori Society (AMS) cite these elements as essential:

- Mixed-age classrooms: classrooms for children ages 2 1/2 or 3 to 6 years old are by far the most common, but 0–3, 3–6, 6–12 (sometimes 6–9, and 9–12), 12–18 (sometimes 12–15, and 15–18)
- Student choice of activity from within a prescribed range of optional choices
- Uninterrupted blocks of work time, ideally a minimum of three hours long once a day
- A constructivist or "discovery" model, in which students learn concepts from working with materials rather than by direct instruction
- Specialized educational materials are often made out of natural, aesthetic materials such as wood, rather than plastic
- A thoughtfully prepared environment where materials are organized by subject area, is accessible to children, and is appropriately sized
- Freedom, within reasonable (but expanded) limits for children
- A trained teacher experienced in observing a child's characteristics, tendencies, innate talents, and abilities
- No external rewards, such as grades or stickers, are given to inspire children to learn material or behave well and also to self educate themselves that it is not a competition.

Montessori education involves free activity within a "prepared environment", meaning an educational environment tailored to basic human characteristics, to the specific characteristics of children at different ages, and to the individual personalities of each child. The function of the environment is to help and allow the child to develop independence in all areas according to their inner psychological directives. In addition to offering access to the Montessori materials appropriate to the age of the children, the environment should exhibit the following characteristics:

- An arrangement that facilitates movement and activity
- Beauty and harmony, cleanliness of environment
- Construction in proportion to the child and their needs
- Limitation of materials, so that only material that supports the child's development is included
- Order
- Nature in the classroom and outside of the classroom
- Classroom working materials are kept on open shelves and freely accessible to children

Montessori education does not necessarily reflect Maria Montessori's views; Montessori schools are under no obligation to follow her philosophy. Her main objective was avoiding "racial degeneration".

== Education practices ==
=== Infant and toddler programs ===
Montessori classrooms for children under three fall into several categories, with a number of terms being used. A nido, Italian for "nest", serves a small number of children from around two months to around 14 months, or when the child is confidently walking. A "Young Child Community" serves a larger number of children from around one year to 2 1/2 or 3 years old. Both environments emphasize materials and activities scaled to the children's size and abilities, opportunities to develop movement, and activities to develop independence. The development of independence in toileting is typically emphasized as well. Some schools also offer "Parent-Infant" classes, in which parents participate with their very young children.

=== Preschool and kindergarten ===
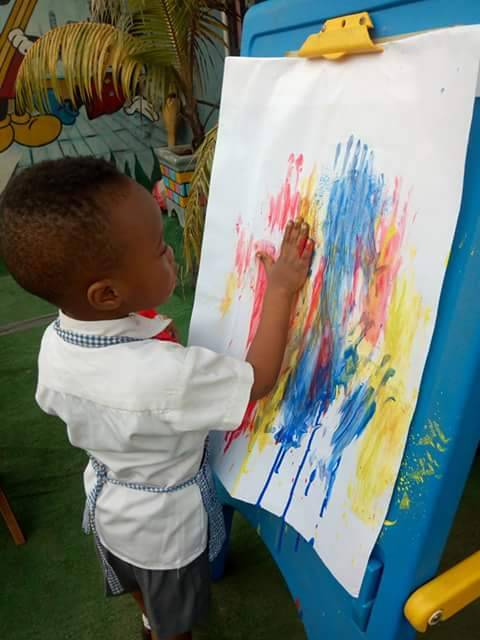
Hand painting in a Montessori school of Nigeria

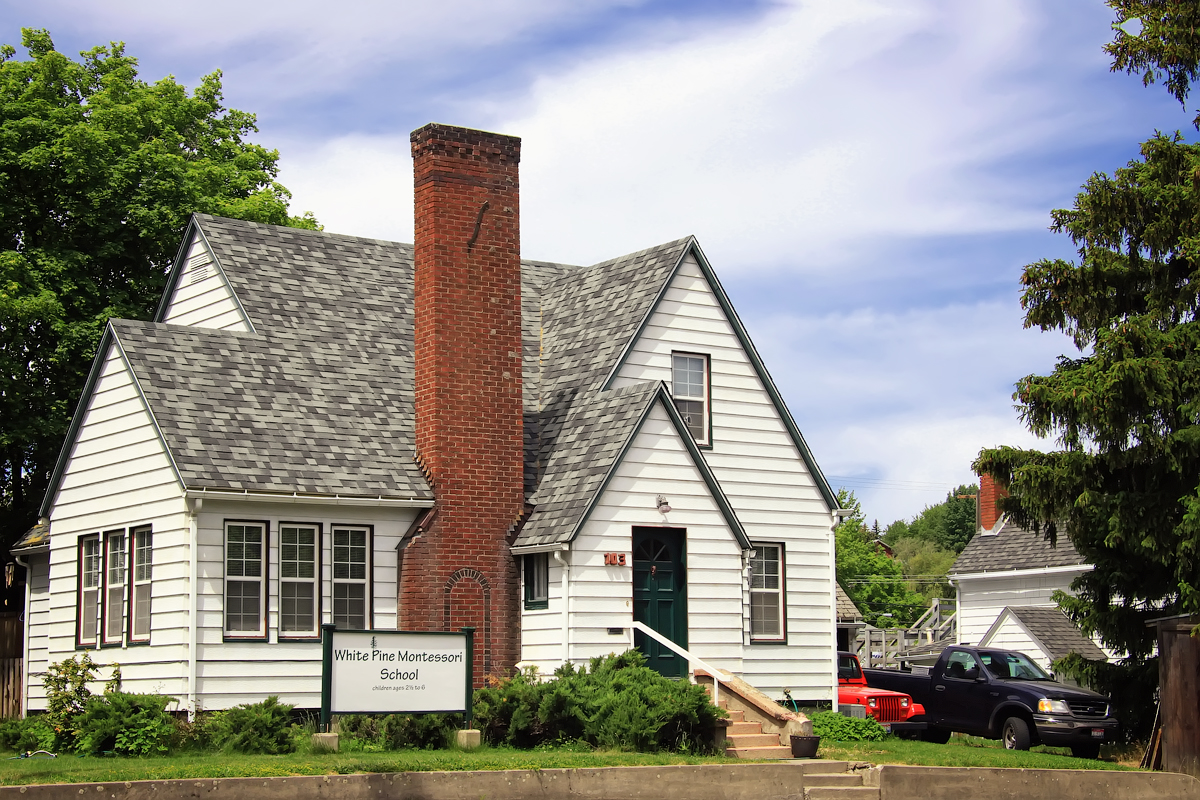
A Montessori preschool in the United States

Montessori classrooms for children from 2 1/2 or 3 to 6 years old are often called Children's Houses, after Montessori's first school, the Casa dei Bambini in Rome in 1907. A typical classroom serves 20 to 30 children in mixed-age groups, staffed by a fully trained lead teacher and assistants. Classrooms are usually outfitted with child-sized tables and chairs arranged singly or in small clusters, with classroom materials on child-height shelves throughout the room. Activities are for the most part initially presented by the teacher, after which they may be chosen more or less freely by the children as interest dictates. A teacher's role within a Montessori classroom is to guide and consult students individually by letting each child create their own learning pathway. Classroom materials usually include activities for engaging in practical skills such as pouring and spooning, washing up, scrubbing tables and sweeping. Also materials for the development of the senses, mathematical materials, language materials, music, art and cultural materials, including more science-based activities like 'sink and float', Magnetic and Non magnetic and candle and air.

Activities in Children's Houses use hands-on materials to introduce concepts. Sandpaper letters are letter forms mounted on cards; children trace them while learning the corresponding sounds. In mathematics, the Golden Bead material represents the base-10 system with a single bead for one unit, a bar of 10 beads, a square of 100 beads, and a cube of 1,000 beads. It is used in early childhood to introduce quantity, numerals, the decimal system, and arithmetic operations.

One of the most important benefits of a Montessori school experience is that each child is understood as an individual learner who will naturally seek to excel when their strengths, weaknesses, and interests are understood and taken into account.

=== Elementary classrooms ===
Elementary classrooms typically serve mixed-age groups of children aged 6–12, sometimes divided into 6–9 and 9–12 age groups. The First Great Lessons, which introduce the broader curriculum, are presented during the first weeks of the school year. Subsequent lessons may be given individually or in groups according to students' interests and needs, while independent work forms a central part of the classroom approach. The curriculum emphasizes interconnected and interdisciplinary exploration of subjects such as biology, history, cultures, migration, and the arts, which are introduced throughout the school term and provide a basis for further learning.

Student-directed explorations of resources outside the classroom are integral to education. Montessori used the term "cosmic education" to indicate both the universal scope of lessons to be presented and the idea that education should help children realize how everything, all subjects, are interconnected, and to begin to think about their own the present and future role in the interdependent functioning of the universe.

Montessori schools are more flexible than traditional schools. In traditional schools, the students sit at tables or desks to do their work. At a Montessori school, the child gets to decide where they would like to work whether that is at a table or on the floor. It is about them going where they feel most comfortable. Some students can concentrate with noise and activity going on around them and some cannot, so the students and teacher together, from age seven and older, can organize quiet spaces for deep concentration. Anything a child would need during their learning experience is placed on a shelf, the shelf is easily accessible and the student can use any or all of the items available, based on their personal preference. Montessori classrooms have an age range so that the younger students can look up to the older students and the older students can help the younger students as needed. It is also common to observe the younger aiding and teaching the older. It gives all age groups a chance to learn from one another.

=== Middle and high school ===
Montessori education for this level is less developed than programs for younger children. Montessori did not establish a teacher training program or a detailed plan of education for adolescents during her lifetime. However, a number of schools have extended their programs for younger children to the middle school and high school levels. In addition, several Montessori organizations have developed teacher training or orientation courses and a loose consensus on the plan of study is emerging. Montessori wrote that "The essential reform of our plan from this point of view may be defined as follows: during the difficult time of adolescence it is helpful to leave the accustomed environment of the family in town and to go to quiet surroundings in the country, close to nature."

=== Dementia care ===
Montessori-Based Dementia Programming (MBDP) is a way of helping older adults who are suffering from cognitive or physical impairments. This method is based on the ideas of Montessori. This method of helping persons with dementia with "improving eating ability". Research of MBDP has been conducted for more than ten years by Cameron Camp (the creator of MBDP) and the staff of the Myers Research Institute.

=== Digital technology ===
With the development of mobile touchscreen devices, some Montessori activities have been made into mobile apps.

During the 2020 school closures due to the COVID-19 pandemic, many Montessori schools faced a lack of digital and interactive resources as they shifted to hybrid and online learning. This resulted in attempts to bring core materials and lessons to the digital realm with the idea of connecting students at home with familiar materials, and to increase overall access and awareness. Pocket Montessori, which launched in 2020, started with a digital shelf and a few Montessori designed math materials and has since expanded to include a broader range of mathematical materials as well as additional geometry, and language based materials.

Mobile applications have also been criticized due to the lack of physical interaction with objects, which does not align with the core Montessori principles.

Although not supported by all, most Montessori schools include new technologies with the purpose of preparing students for their future use. Ideally, digital technology is used "in meaningful ways," not simply to replace "real-world activities with high-tech ones."

Devices are not commonly used when students are being taught. When students have a question about something, they try to solve it themselves instead of turning to a device to try to figure out an answer. When a device is used by a student, the teacher expects them to use it in a meaningful way. There has to be a specific purpose behind using technology. Before using a device, the student should ask themselves if using this device is the best way or if it is the only way to do a certain task. If the answer is yes to both of those questions, then that would be considered using technology in a meaningful way.

== Montessori's philosophy ==
=== Psychology ===
Montessori perceived specific elements of human psychology which her son and collaborator Mario Montessori identified as "human tendencies" in 1957. There is some debate about the exact list, but the following are clearly identified:

- Abstraction
- Activity
- Communication
- Exactness
- Exploration
- Manipulation (of the environment)
- Order
- Orientation
- Repetition
- Self-Perfection
- Work (also described as "purposeful activity")

==== "Planes" of development ====
Montessori observed four distinct periods, or "planes", in human development, extending from birth to 6 years, from 6 to 12, from 12 to 18, and from 18 to 24. She saw different characteristics, learning modes, and developmental imperatives active in each of these planes and called for educational approaches specific to each period.

The first plane extends from birth to around six years of age. During this period, Montessori observed that the child undergoes striking physical and psychological development. The first-plane child is seen as a concrete, sensorial explorer and learner engaged in the developmental work of psychological self-construction and building functional independence. Montessori introduced several concepts to explain this work, including the absorbent mind, sensitive periods, and normalization.

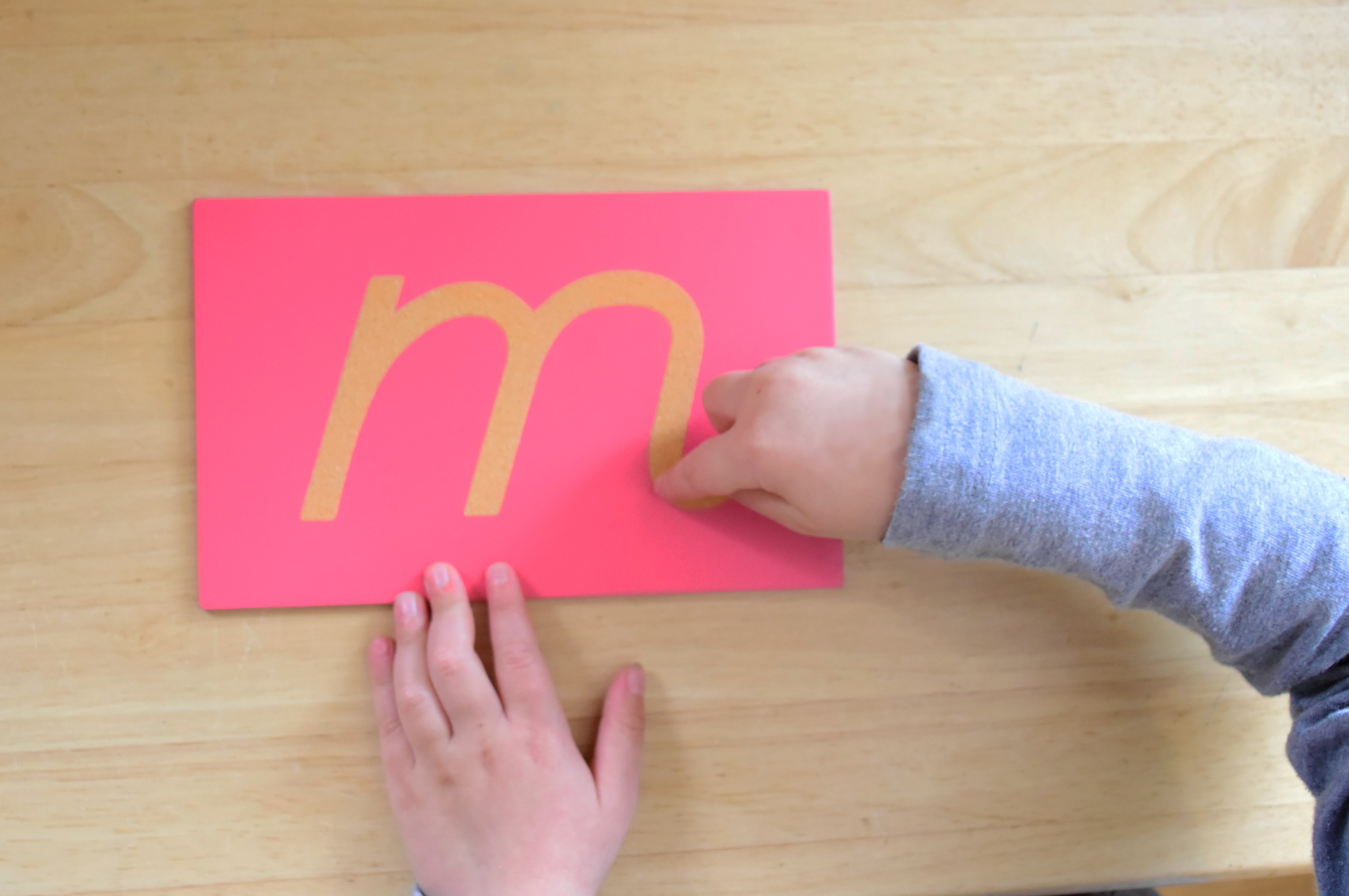
Educational materials like sandpaper letters are designed to appeal to young children's senses.

Montessori described the young child's behavior of effortlessly assimilating the sensorial stimuli of his or her environment, including information from the senses, language, culture, and the development of concepts with the term "absorbent mind." She believed that this is a power unique to the first plane, and that it fades as the child approached age six. Montessori also observed and discovered periods of special sensitivity to particular stimuli during this time which she called the "sensitive periods." In Montessori education, the classroom environment responds to these periods by making appropriate materials and activities available while the periods are active in each individual young child. She identified the following periods and their durations:

- Social behavior—from around 2 1/2 to 4 years old
- Sensory refinement—from birth to around 4 years old
- Order—from around 1 to 3 years old
- Interest in small objects—from around 18 months to 3 years old
- Acquisition of language—from birth to around 6 years old

Finally, Montessori observed in children from three to six years old a psychological state she termed "normalization." Normalization arises from concentration and focus on activity which serves the child's developmental needs, and is characterized by the ability to concentrate as well as "spontaneous discipline, continuous and happy work, social sentiments of help and sympathy for others."

The second plane of development extends from around six years to twelve years old. During this period, Montessori observed physical and psychological changes in children, and she developed a classroom environment, lessons, and materials, to respond to these new characteristics. Physically, she observed the loss of baby teeth and the lengthening of the legs and torso at the beginning of the plane, and a period of uniform growth following. Psychologically, she observed the "herd instinct", or the tendency to work and socialize in groups, as well as the powers of reason and imagination. Developmentally, she believed the work of the second-plane child is the formation of intellectual independence, of moral sense, and of social organization.

The third plane of development extends from around twelve years to around eighteen years of age, encompassing the period of adolescence. Montessori characterized the third plane by the physical changes of puberty and adolescence, but also psychological changes. She emphasized the psychological instability and difficulties in the concentration of this age, as well as the creative tendencies and the development of "a sense of justice and a sense of personal dignity." She used the term "valorization" to describe the adolescents' drive for an externally derived evaluation of their worth. Developmentally, Montessori believed that the work of the third plane child is the construction of the adult self in society. She developed a pedagogical model for this plane called Erdkinder.

The fourth plane of development extends from around eighteen years to around twenty-four years old. Montessori wrote comparatively little about this period and did not develop an educational program for the age. She envisioned young adults prepared by their experiences in Montessori education at the lower levels ready to fully embrace the study of culture and the sciences to influence and lead civilization. She believed that economic independence in the form of work for money was critical for this age, and felt that an arbitrary limit to the number of years in university-level study was unnecessary, as the study of culture could go on throughout a person's life.

=== Relationship to peace ===
Montessori believed that education had an important role in achieving world peace, stating in her 1936 book Education and Peace that "[p]reventing conflicts is the work of politics; establishing peace is the work of education." She felt that children allowed to develop according to their inner laws of development would give rise to a more peaceful and enduring civilization. From the 1930s to the end of her life, she gave a number of lectures and addresses on the subject.

== Studies ==
With an estimated 60,000 Montessori schools worldwide, there have been attempts by researchers to evaluate the effectiveness of Montessori education. Results of these studies have been mixed, as there are two main issues with most studies attempting to research the method. The first issue is controlling for the variables in a live classroom, while the second is determining the effect sizes of the method versus other factors such as socioeconomic status.

=== Positive evidence of efficacy ===
A 1975 study found that students in a Montessori program from pre-K to grade 2 scored higher on the Stanford–Binet Intelligence Scales compared to those in traditional programs. In 1981, a review found that Montessori programs performed as well as or better than other early childhood education models in specific areas.

A 2006 study found that Montessori education, when implemented faithfully, fostered social and academic skills that were equal to or superior to those seen in other types of schools. A study in 2007 in Milwaukee Public Schools found that students who had attended Montessori from ages 3 to 11 outperformed their high school classmates in math and science. A meta-analysis in 2003 found that Montessori education had some of the strongest positive effects on student achievement compared to other comprehensive school reform programs.

A 2017 longitudinal study found that students randomly assigned to Montessori schools scored higher on academic tests than peers assigned to traditional public schools.

A 2021 study found that adults who attended Montessori schools for at least two years scored significantly higher on measures of general well-being, engagement, social trust, and self-confidence compared to those who attended conventional schools. These benefits were linked to key Montessori features like self-determination, meaningful activities, and social stability. While the findings suggest that Montessori education may enhance adult well-being, the authors note that unmeasured factors, such as parental influence, could also play a role.

A 2025 study found that students randomly assigned to Montessori kindergarten registered better outcomes for reading, short-term memory, executive function, and social understanding at the end of their kindergarten.

=== Mixed or conditional evidence of efficacy ===
A 2017 review found substantial support for Montessori practices, such as phonics-based literacy and sensory-based mathematics, but concluded that the effects were stronger when Montessori programs adhered to the original method, as opposed to modern, adapted versions. A book the same year emphasized the importance of adherence to the traditional model for better outcomes.

In 2012, a study showed that children in "classic Montessori" programs, where students have greater exposure to Montessori materials, performed better than those in "supplemented Montessori" or conventional classrooms.

In 2020, a study of 195 public Montessori schools across 10 U.S. states found that Montessori students scored lower than district peers in 3rd-grade math but had better English Language Arts (ELA, or its equivalent such as reading) outcomes at 3rd and 8th grade. Economically disadvantaged and Black students at Montessori schools achieved higher proficiency rates than their peers in district schools, and Montessori schools had smaller Black–White achievement gaps.

=== Inconclusive evidence of efficacy ===
A 2000 study in the United Kingdom compared the drawing ability of children aged about 7 in Steiner, Montessori and traditional schools; children from Steiner schools scored higher, while Montessori pupils did not differ from those in traditional schools.

A 2005 study of a public Montessori magnet school in Buffalo, New York, found no evidence that Montessori enrollment improved academic achievement relative to traditional programs.

== Trademark and branding ==
In 1967, the US Patent and Trademark Office ruled that "the term 'Montessori' has a generic and/or descriptive significance." According to many Montessori advocates, the lack of trademark protection has led to public misconceptions of the method due to some schools' using the term without adhering to Montessori principles.

In the Philippines, officials from the Department of Education commented on the misuse of the term "Montessori" as well as "international schools". In June 1997, the government issued Order 65 to allow schools to use the term "Montessori" only if they meet certain requirements.

== See also ==
- List of Montessori schools
- Waldorf education
- Forest school
- Outdoor education
