= Alice Hallgarten =

American-born Italian philanthropist, feminist, and pedagogist

Alice Hallgarten Franchetti
- Born: Alice Hallgarten; June 23, 1874; New York City, New York, United States
- Died: October 22, 1911 (aged 37); Leysin, Switzerland
- Occupations: Philanthropist, pedagogist, patron
- Spouse: Leopoldo Franchetti
- Parents: Adolph Hallgarten (father); Julia Hallgarten (mother)

Alice Hallgarten Franchetti (born Alice Hallgarten) was an American philanthropist and pedagogue who was influential for her social projects and collaborative work with Maria Montessori at the Villa Montesca.

Her parents, J. Adolph Hallgarten and Julia Nordheimer, were both well-to-do German Ashkenazi Jews who financed the construction of railways, lent money to large industrial groups, and were founding partners of the Hallgarten & Co. bank of New York. Critics such as Maria Luciana Buseghin argue that Alice's efforts were due to a unique combination of personality traits and experiences. Her family was deeply involved in philanthropic efforts, as Busghin argues in Alice Hallgarten Franchetti: A Woman Beyond Barriers, which was common in the Jewish community due to the tradition of charity or tzedakah (59-53). However, while her parents were of Jewish origin, Alice did not openly practice the religion. Buseghin argues that "many initiatives undertaken by Alice Hallgarten strongly echo those of her uncle Charles" who Alice referred to as her "second father"

After the death of her father in 1885, Alice spent her childhood in Frankfurt, Germany where she was raised by her Uncle Charles. She had two siblings, a sister named Eleanore born in 1890 and a brother Walter, who died of tuberculosis in Schwarzwald at 38 years old in 1908. The year after her brother's death, Alice's mother would succumb to the same disease. After having spent the majority of her childhood in Germany, Alice moved to Rome, where she started providing aid and assistance services in the Quartiere San Lorenzo. It was here at the neighborhood pharmacy where Alice met her future husband Leopoldo Franchetti, whom she would later marry in Rome on June 9, 1900.

== Political and social works ==
Alice and Leopoldo dedicated themselves to humanitarian efforts aimed at helping impoverished and uneducated Italians, which were increasing in number due to inequality between the North and South post-unification and industrialization and the agrarian crisis. In addition to his political endeavours, Leopoldo was directly involved in research projects, developing the Southern Italian regions having founded the National Association for the Interests of Southern Italy, and in debates on emigration and colonialism. The primary residence of Alice and Leopoldo - the Villa Montesca - was built on Mount Arnato, near Città di Castello in the province of Umbria, between 1885 and 1889 by Leopoldo.

Alice worked closely and was guided by German philosopher and writer Malwida Rivalier von Meysenbug. Meysenbug was a feminist and dedicated pedagogue who promoted self-formation and spiritual growth. Alice would finance her most important work: Memoiren einer Idealistin. The pharmacy where Alice and Leopoldo first met, the pharmacy of the San Lorenzo district in Rome, was founded by Alice and Don Brizio Casciola, a priest from Umbria, and "was founded in 1894 to aid the homeless in the poorest neighbourhood of Rome." Alice was active in many different philanthropic groups such as the Ladies' Committee of the Roman Federation of Women's Works, a charity group interested in women's issues. Alice would then move onto the idea of producing a weaving workshop creating Tela Umbra where women could improve upon and monetize their generational skills. The Villa Montesca would later become a pedagogical institute where mothers could work while their children received an education.

== Meeting and support of Maria Montessori ==
Giovanna Alatri in Maria Montessori e Maria Maraini Guerrieri Gonzaga recounts how both Alice and Leopoldo were deeply interested in new methods of experimental learning proposed by Montessori. As such, they offered to fund Montessori's book which was published at their expense and presented in the Villa Montesca in Umbria to a group of educators. The Franchettis decided to establish the Women's Vocational School in Città di Castello in 1909 with the goal of teaching women basic household and developmental skill. Courses in elementary sociology and scientific pedagogy were to be taught by Montessori. This experience heavily impacted Montessori's research and hypotheses on education, and would later be built upon at the Franchetti schools of Villa Montesca and Rovigliano, founded by Alice and Leopoldo around 1901–1902. Montessori's relationship with Alice would only grow with time, and in 1909 she wrote at the Villa Montesca her most important work Il metodo della pedagogia scientifica applicato all'educazione infantile nelle case dei bambini which was funded and published at the expense of the Franchetti's.
