= Leopoldo Franchetti =

Italian writer (1847–1917)

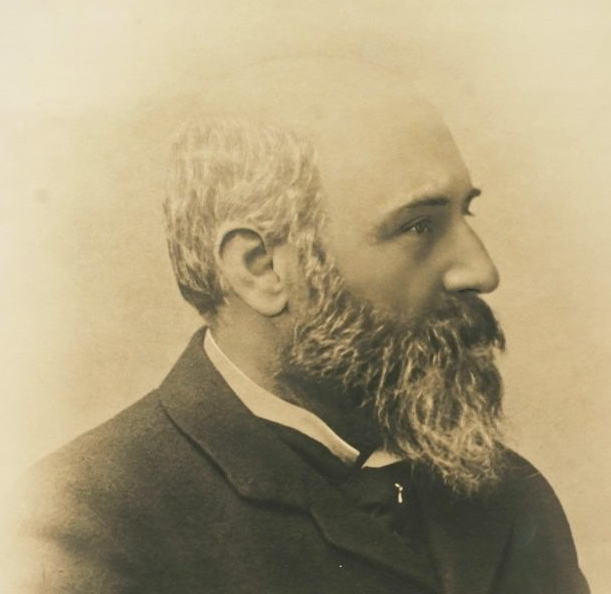
- Born: 31 May 1847; Livorno, Italy
- Died: 4 November 1917 (aged 70); Rome, Italy
- Occupations: Publicist and politician
- Known for: Inquiry into the Sicilian Mafia
- Spouse: Alice Hallgarten

Leopoldo Franchetti (Italian pronunciation: [leoˈpɔldo fraŋˈketti]; 31 May 1847 – 4 November 1917) was an Italian publicist, politician, and patron. He was a deputy in the Italian Chamber of Deputies and later became a Senator. He was very active in promoting education and concrete solutions for economic, social and political problems in Italy both through his own political initiatives and through his support of his wife Alice Hallgarten.

== Early life ==
Franchetti was born in Livorno into a Jewish family in good standing. The Franchetti family came to Livorno from Tunisia in the last decades of the eighteenth century. From the Napoleonic era to the second half of the 1830s they were one of the most important families in the local Jewish community.

Leopoldo Franchetti was influenced by the ideas of John Stuart Mill and became a liberal. His relation with his Jewishness was so conflictual that no trace of it can be found in his public activity. In 1873, he took a sabbatical in southern Italy and became one of the foremost authorities regarding the "problems of southern Italy", and pioneer of meridionalism.

== Inquiry into the Mafia ==
In 1876, Franchetti travelled to Sicily with Sidney Sonnino to conduct an unofficial inquiry into the state of Sicilian society. In 1877, the two men published their research on Sicily in a substantial two-part report. In the first part Sonnino analysed the lives of the island's landless peasants. Franchetti's half of the report, Political and Administrative Conditions in Sicily, was an analysis of the Mafia in the nineteenth century that is still considered authoritative today. Franchetti would ultimately influence thinking about the Mafia more than anyone else until Giovanni Falcone over a hundred years later. Political and Administrative Conditions in Sicily is the first convincing explanation of how the Mafia came to be.

Franchetti saw the Mafia as an "industry of violence" and described the designation of the term "Mafia": "the term mafia found a class of violent criminals ready and waiting for a name to define them, and, given their special character and importance in Sicilian society, they had the right to a different name from that defining vulgar criminals in other countries". He saw the Mafia as deeply rooted in Sicilian society and impossible to quench unless the very structure of the island's social institutions were to undergo a fundamental change. The Franchetti-Sonnino report was rebuked and labelled as 'unpatriotic'. It is now considered one of the most coherent and comprehensive accounts of the Sicilian mafia and its surroundings.

== In Eritrea ==
Franchetti, as an agricultural advisor of the Italian government in Eritrea, estimated that there was plenty of land and few people in Eritrea and recommended the colonization of the highlands by Italian settlers. He undertook the first land expropriations in 1893 with the vision that two million Italian peasants would settle down in Eritrea. Large tracts of land were declared public and all grazing land was declared state owned, which was a clear interference with the traditional land right system in the highlands.

However, the highlands were only sparsely populated because of the great famine in 1888–92 as a result of rinderpest (see 1890s African rinderpest epizootic) and subsequent epidemics. Returning to their villages they had abandoned because of the famine, they saw their land confiscated. Riots and revolts broke out and most of the Italian settlers returned to Italy in dismay.

== Civil passion ==
In 1880 Franchetti moved to Città di Castello and in 1900 married Alice Hallgarten born in New York in 1874, with whom he moved into the recently completed Villa della Montesca. The educator and reformer Maria Montessori collaborated with Hallgarten on the creation of a seminar which gave life to the first publication of the Method for Scientific Pedagogy, universally known as the Montessori Method. Montessori's first training course for teachers was conducted at Villa della Montesca in 1909.

Franchetti died of mysterious causes, perhaps suicide, after the dawn of the defeat in the Caporetto in World War I and left his estate to a charitable organization and his farm to the farmers who worked it.
