= Pact for Sicily =

Italian Political Party

Pact for Sicily (Patto per la Sicilia, PpS) was a political party in Italy, based in Sicily.

It emerged in 2005 by the split from New Sicily, a mainly social-democratic party, of the Christian-democratic faction led by Nicolò Nicolosi, who had been the party's only member of the Chamber of Deputies since 2001. Shortly before the 2008 regional election, the PpS was merged into the Movement for Autonomy.

== See also ==
- Southern Italy autonomist movements
