= Montessori in India =

Growth of Montessori in India

Montessori education in India has grown in popularity since Maria Montessori, founder of the Montessori method, was forced to stay in India during World War II, from 1939–1946.

== History ==
Prior to Maria Montessori's arrival in India, Rabindranath Tagore and Mahatma Gandhi were aware of her pedagogical method. By 1929, Tagore had founded many "Tagore-Montessori" schools in India (including at Shantiniketan), and Indian interest in Montessori education was strongly represented at the International Congress in 1929.

Montessori's work in India began with her arrival there in 1939. Montessori education was established in India in the form of preschools and schools that are now affiliated with Association Montessori Internationale. Maria Montessori was responsible for the creation of a teacher training centre in the neighbourhood of Adyar, Madras (present-day Chennai). Her work continued on in India through her designated representatives, Albert M. Joosten and S. R. Swamy, before spreading further.

In 1939, George Arundale and Rukmini Devi Arundale, leaders of the Theosophical Society, extended an invitation to the 69-year-old Montessori. She accepted the invitation and reached India the same year. She made Adyar, Chennai her home and lived there along with her son, Mario M. Montessori. The Montessorians, Gool Minwala, Tehmina Wadia and Khurshed Taraporewala were students in the first training at Adyar.

In 1940, when India entered World War II, Montessori and her son were interned as enemy aliens in India, but despite this Maria was allowed to conduct training courses. Sixteen courses were conducted during this time, creating a very strong base for the method. She also had her own school in Kodaikanal for this duration. In 1947, she went back to Europe for a brief period. Montessori returned to India for a second time the same year to conduct a few more courses in Chennai, Pune, Ahmedabad and Karachi. The Montessoris then returned to Europe, leaving Albert Max Joosten as their representative in India. Maria Montessori died in 1952 in the Netherlands at the age of 81.

== Modern day Montessori education in India ==
Unlike many Montessori learning centers, only a few authentic Montessori schools in India abide by the mixed age group procedure. This method allows older children to assist in guiding the younger children in their groups. Groups are based upon interest and experiences rather than the capability or skill of a student.

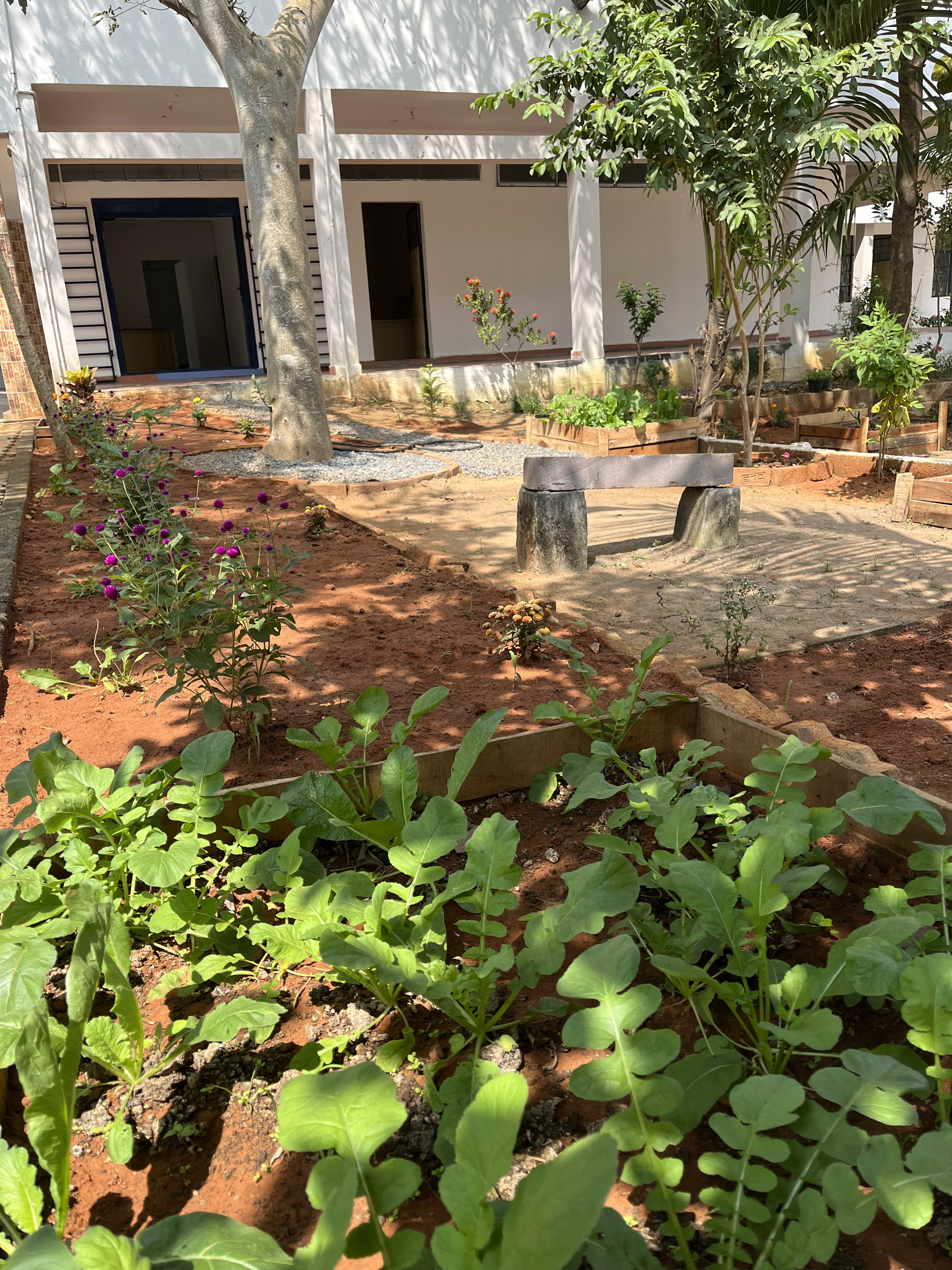
A simple Urban Farm Integration Model at Hive Montessori School Chennai

In an essay from 1996, Carolyn Cottom notes that the school's objective is to prepare its students for the complex issues of society that occur at the global level. Students are taken to visit the various places of worship in India. They are also taught about peace education; students learn that 'the Golden Rule' is a concept that is often taught across all world religions. Furthermore, the teacher's role is not only to teach subjects to students but to act as a mentor in the child's spiritual journey.
