= Southern Italy autonomist movements =

Regionalist movement in Europe

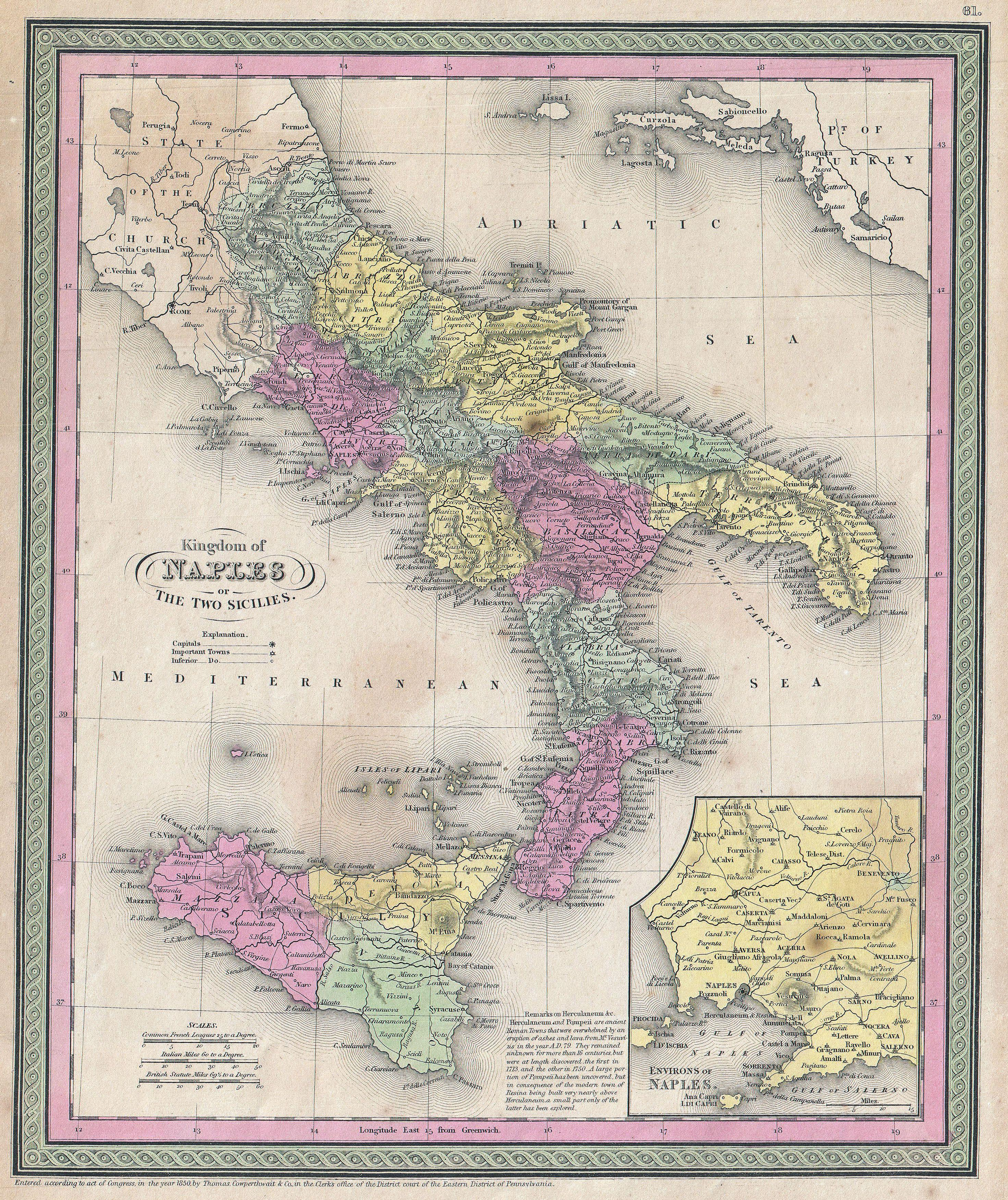
The last southern Italian state before the Italian unification, the Kingdom of the two Sicilies

In Italy, there are some active movements and parties calling for autonomy or even independence for the areas comprised within the historical Kingdom of the two Sicilies: that is, Southern Italy and/or the region of Sicily. No political movement promoting these ideas has ever been successful in gaining traction among the population. The movement remains on the fringes with no representation in the Italian parliament.

The main regional languages of Southern Italy are from the Italo-Dalmatian family, being Neapolitan (dark turquoise) and Sicilian (dark purple).

== Languages ==
Most of the languages traditionally spoken in southern Italy (historically the Kingdom of the two Sicilies) are grouped as dialects of the Neapolitan and Sicilian languages. Like the Gallo-Romance languages spoken in the north, these dialects are different from standard Italian, though the Neapolitan variants are similar to the central language group which includes the Tuscan language on which standard Italian is based. Sicilian has a very strong Greek-Arab substratum, which give the languages many distinct sounds and flavors not typical of Italian.

== Southern Question ==
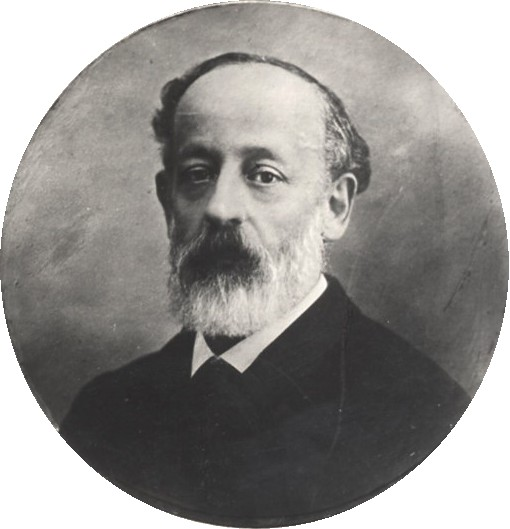
Pasquale Villari

Many academics, politicians and other influential people have contributed to "Meridionalism" (meridionalismo), opinions, and research, analysis and policy proposals regarding the south of Italy. Historically concentrating only on the economic gap between the north and south of Italy, the southern question and problem is now seen in the broader context of Europe.

The historian Pasquale Villari (1827–1917), the politician Sidney Sonnino (1847–1922) and the publicist Leopoldo Franchetti (1847–1917) were among the first to study in depth the effect of annexation to the Kingdom of Italy. To some of them, the unification was a form of military and economic colonialism. The early Meridionalists, although conservative, did not hesitate to reveal the serious responsibility of the government and the ruling classes, especially landowners.

The solutions the Meridionalists proposed varied considerably due to their different viewpoints and political affiliations. For example, the writer and politician Napoleone Colajanni (1847–1921), a positivist and socialist, supported state intervention in the south as the only way to develop the area. On the other hand, Antonio De Viti De Marco (1858–1943), a liberal economist and radical deputy, accepted state regulation of "natural" monopolies, but believed in free trade and was hostile to state interventionism.

Francesco Saverio Nitti, (1868–1953) was an economist and political figure. A Radical, he served as the prime minister of Italy between 1919 and 1920. According to the Catholic Encyclopedia ("Theories of Overpopulation"), Nitti (Population and the Social System, 1894) was a staunch critic of English economist Thomas Robert Malthus and his Principle of Population.

Gaetano Salvemini graduated in literature in Florence in 1896. He taught History at the universities of Messina (during the 1908 Messina earthquake he was the only survivor of his entire family), Pisa and Florence. From 1919 to 1921 he served in Italian Parliament. As member of the Italian Socialist Party he fought for Universal Suffrage for the moral and economic rebirth of Italy's Mezzogiorno (southern Italy), and against corruption in politics.

== World War II and Sicilian Independence Movement ==
The Committee for the Independence of Sicily (Comitato per l'Indipendenza della Sicilia, CIS) was founded in September 1942 during the struggle between the Italian/German Axis and the US/Russian/British Allies.

The Allied forces successfully invaded Sicily in July 1943, and in general were warmly embraced by the Sicilian population influenced by Mafia gangsters like Lucky Luciano.

The CIS gained authority following the Armistice of Cassibile of 8 September 1943. In the spring of 1944, the CIS was disbanded and the Sicilian Independence Movement (Movimento Indipendentista Siciliano, MIS) was founded. Although the Allies prohibited any kind of political activity, they tolerated the existence of the MIS.

Italy became a Republic in 1946 and as part of the Constitution of Italy, Sicily was one of the five regions given special status as an autonomous region. Both the partial Italian land reform and special funding from the Italian government's Cassa per il Mezzogiorno (Fund for the South) from 1950 to 1984, helped the Sicilian economy improve.

However, the MIS remained active after the war. One of the best-known members was Salvatore Giuliano, who formed a band variously described as mafia-members or bandits, evading capture until he was killed in 1950. Another early supporter was Calogero Vizzini, one of the most influential and legendary Mafia bosses of Sicily after World War II until his death in 1954, but Vizzini later shifted alliance to the Christian Democrat party.

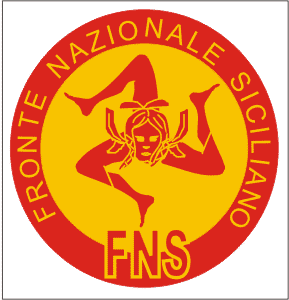
Emblem of the Fronte Nazionale Siciliano

The political arm of the movement today calls itself the Sicilian National Front, (Italian: Fronte Nazionale Siciliano, Sicilian: Frunti Nazziunali Sicilianu) and is a socialist political party founded in 1964. Its Secretary General since 1976 is Giuseppe Naics. The movement is no longer a significant force. In the regional elections of 2006 the party obtained 679 votes in Palermo, or 0.2% of the vote.

== Autonomous Magna Graecia movement ==
Since the beginning of the 2010s, an online social movement has been launched to awaken the Greek consciousness of the inhabitants of Southern Italy and also to express an opinion that highlights the desire of a part of the inhabitants of the south for secession from the state of Italy, its union with the Hellenism of the Mediterranean Sea (and re-establishment of Magna Graecia and the Kingdom of the Two Sicilies).

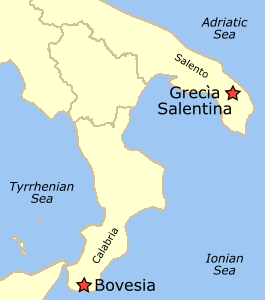
Griko-speaking areas in Salento and Calabria

Through pages on Facebook, historical issues are highlighted that have more to do with the Greek presence in Italy that begins with the migration of the Greek diaspora in the 8th century BC., the linguistic minority, known as Griko in Calabria, Apulia and Messina, the modern day Greeks of Italy and in general the inhabitants of the south who call themselves Great-Greeks (MagnoGreci).

Greek minority flag of Sicily

The largest Facebook page highlighting the specific issues called "Stato Magna Grecia - Due Sicilie", has over 270,000 followers, mainly Italians but also several Griko, expressing the need for the secession of Southern Italy, the so-called Mezzogiorno and its enosis with Greece and Cyprus. This page and other pages based in Italy highlight the achievements of ancient Magna Graecia and the Kingdom of the Two Sicilies as well as the close relations that the people of Southern Italy have with Greece.

According to the administrators, the unification of Italy, in which Garibaldi's campaign in Sicily in 1860 played a decisive role, represents for many inhabitants of southern Italy the beginning of a form of colonialism, as for them the union was made on the terms of the Italian north, which essentially imposed its own powers, its language, and its culture, while the Italian South was more economically developed than the North, but this trend was reversed after unification. Thus emerge views interwoven with neo-bourbonism (Italian: Neoborbonismo) which is a form of nostalgia for the Kingdom of the Two Sicilies, a term coined in 1960 and born with the creation of the separatist movements in Italy, while experiencing a significant increase in popularity around 2011 during the celebrations of the 150th anniversary of the Unification of Italy, the same decade of prominence of the movement of the re-Hellenization and independence of Greater Greece. The Neo-Bourbonist movement is supported by small political movements, amateur websites, leading the Italian newspaper Corriere del Mezzogiorno to report that "Neo-Bourbon revanchism is in vogue in recent years..."

On a political level, the administrators of the said Magna Graecia - Two Sicilies pages urged followers during the 2023 national elections in Greece to vote for political parties supporting the demand for independence of South Italy and union with Greece.

According to Italian media, the Italian political party "Insorgenza Magnogreca" led by Luigi Lista and based in Naples presents itself as a movement that represents, among others, the Greek identity of Southern Italy. The association "Comitato provincia della Magna Graecia" chaired by Domenico Mazza was created with the aim of promoting the union of all the regions of South Italy into a new separate great region of Italy and developing a stronger connection with Greece.

In Greece, the far-right party "Hellenic world empire" (Ελληνική Κοσμοκρατορία), which officially seeks the secession of the Italian south, participated in the 2019 European elections in a joint descent with the Popular Orthodox Rally party and the Patriotic Radical Union party of the independent MEP, elected with the Golden Dawn of Eleftherios Synadinos gathered the 1.23%.

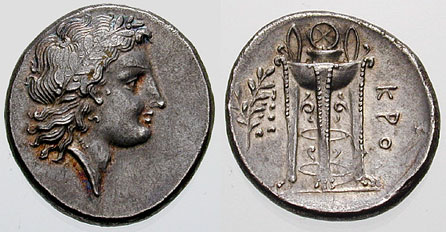
An ancient Greek coin c. 330–300 BC. found in Croton, South Italy with the head of Apollo (left) and ornate tripod (right)

According to Greek media, the inhabitants of South Italy already have their own flag with the emblem of the ancient greek tripod symbolizing the oracle of Delphi by Pythia that determined where the Greek colonies should be established in Italy, as well as an informal national anthem, created by the Greek soprano Sonia Theodoridou.

== Current parties and groups ==
There continue to be various political parties and organizations who lobby for greater autonomy in the South, but they don't claim widespread support.

=== Movement for the Autonomies ===
The Movement for the Autonomies (Movimento per le Autonomie, MpA) is a minor centrist regionalist political party in Italy. It demands economic development and greater autonomy primarily for Sicily, but also for other regions of Southern Italy. The party is led by Raffaele Lombardo, President of Sicily. In the 2008 general election, the party won 1.1% of the vote (7.4% in Sicily) and obtained 8 deputies and 2 senators through an alliance with The People of Freedom and Lega Nord parties. After the election the MpA joined the Berlusconi coalition.

=== Sicilian Alliance ===
The Sicilian Alliance (Alleanza Siciliana) is a minor autonomist and national-conservative political party in Sicily, Italy. It was founded in 2005 and was led by Nello Musumeci, an MEP who was elected on the National Alliance's list. On 7 October 2007, the party joined to Francesco Storace's The Right, although maintaining some of its autonomy as a regional section of the party, named the "Sicilian Alliance – The Right", often shortened as "The Sicilian Right".

=== Neo-Bourbon Cultural Association ===
Coat of arms of the Kingdom of the Two Sicilies

The Associazione culturale Neoborbonica, or Neo-Bourbon Cultural Association is dedicated to restoring the history of the Bourbon kingdom, its glory, art, culture and identity, which they consider to have been, “maliciously falsified by the Piedmontese invaders.” They aim to reconstruct the historical memory of the Two Sicilies, reconstruct their pride in being Southern Italian, and work towards the salvation of this ancient nation. Passions are still high. When Prince Victor Emmanuel, head of the House of Savoy, returned to Italy in 2003 after a long exile he met hostility from both the neo-fascist Italian Social Movement and the Neo-Bourbon Movement in Naples in the form of posters, stickers and demonstrations.

=== Two Sicilies Cultural Association ===
The Associazione Culturale Due Sicilie, or Two Sicilies Cultural Association is a website / blog that publishes commentary on the news as it affects the south of Italy. It is highly critical of government treatment of the south, and describes itself as a forum for discussing independence. It supports a Bourbon restoration on the grounds that a monarch would be more impartial than current politicians.

There is also a Two Sicilies national football team.

=== Land and Liberation ===
Land and Liberation, or Terra e Liberazione is a pressure group founded in 1984 by a branch of the FNS that supports continued autonomy of Sicily with independent development of the economy. The group is politically far to the left, but has recently joined the Movement for Autonomy.

=== Research Institutes ===
Several specialized research institutes today study the southern Italian economy in an attempt to better understand the problem and develop well-targeted economic policies. These include the Associazione nazionale per gli interessi del Mezzogiorno d'Italia (ANIMO) based in Rome, the Associazione per lo sviluppo dell'industria nel Mezzogiorno (SVIMEZ) also based in Rome, and the Associazione Studi e Ricerche per il Mezzogiorno (SRM) based in Naples.

=== Other regionalist and independentist political parties ===
- I the South (2009-2016)
- Lega Sud Ausonia
- New Sicily (2001-2008)
- Pact for Sicily (-2008)
- Southern Action League
- Southern Democratic Party (2006-2007)
- Social Christian Sicilian Union (1958-1963)
- We the South
- Party of the South
