= Baby sign =

Signed language systems used with hearing infants/toddlers

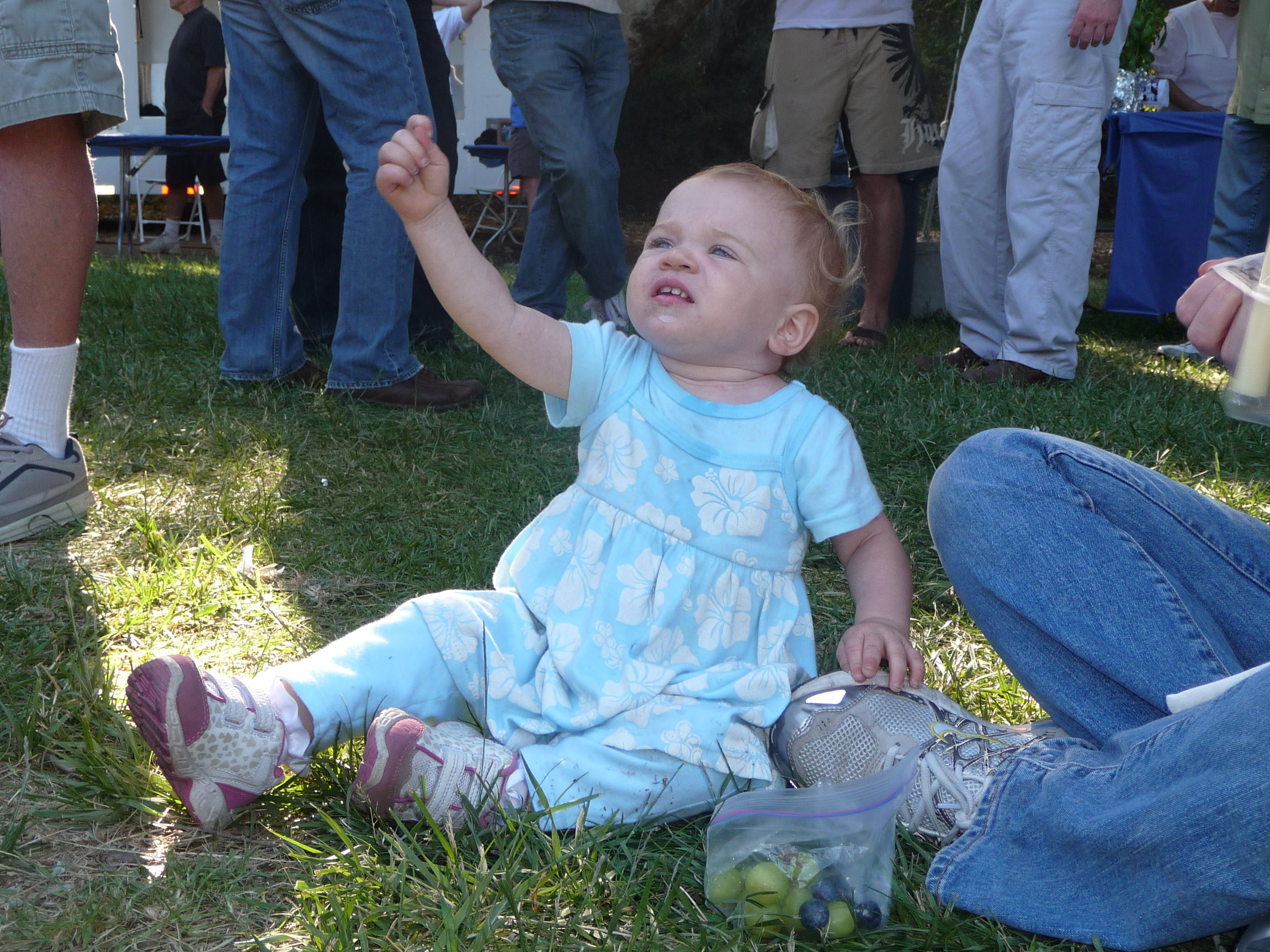
A child signing the concept of "bird"

Baby sign, or baby signing, is the use of manual signing allowing infants and toddlers to communicate emotions, desires, and objects prior to spoken language development. With guidance and encouragement, signing develops from a natural stage in infant development known as gesture. These gestures are taught in conjunction with speech to hearing children, and are not the same as a sign language. Some common benefits that have been found through the use of baby sign programs include an increased parent-child bond and communication, decreased frustration, and improved self-esteem for both the parent and child. Researchers have found that baby sign neither benefits nor harms the language development of infants. Promotional products and ease of information access have increased the attention that baby sign receives, making it pertinent that caregivers become educated before making the decision to use baby sign.

== Overview ==
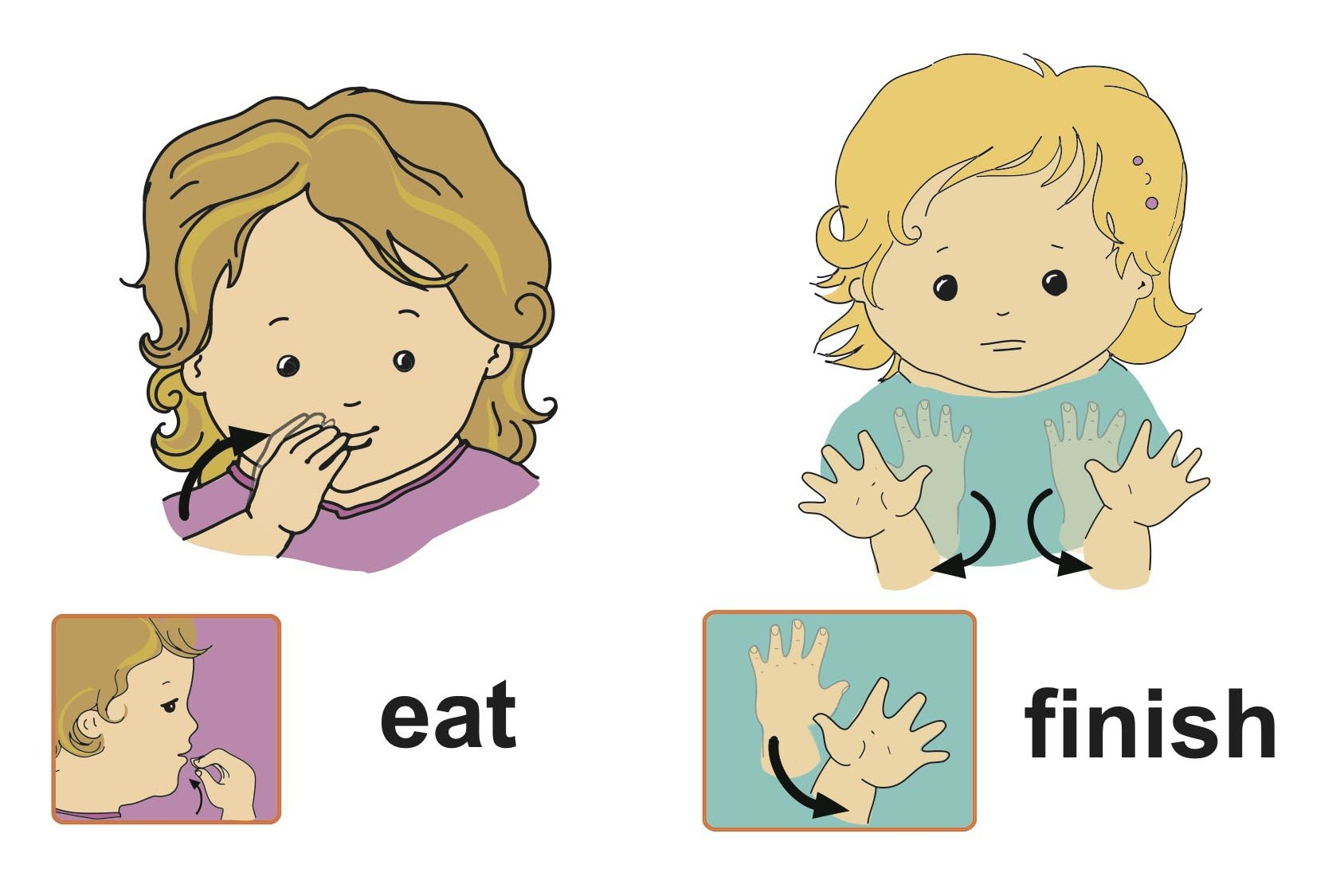
Signs for "eat" and "finish" in American Sign Language

Baby sign involves enhanced gestures and altered signs that infants are taught in conjunction with spoken words with the intention of creating richer parent-child communication. The main reason that parents use baby sign is with hope that it will reduce the frustration involved in trying to interpret their pre-verbal child's needs. It can be considered a useful method of communication in the early developmental stages, since speech production follows children's ability to express themselves through bodily movement.

Baby sign is distinct from sign language. Baby sign is used by hearing parents with hearing children to improve communication. Sign languages, including ASL, BSL, ISL and others, are natural languages, typically used in the Deaf community. Sign languages maintain their own grammar, and sentence structure. Because sign languages are as complex to learn as any spoken language, simplified signs are often used with infants in baby sign. Teaching baby signs allows for greater flexibility in the form of sign and does not require the parent to learn the grammar of a sign language. Baby signs are usually gestures or signs taken from the sign language community and modified to make them easier for an infant to form.

It is common for the difference between symbolic gestures and baby signs to be mistaken. Symbolic gestures are a form of communication that children adopt before they develop the ability to produce spoken language. This includes pointing to what they want or using a hand motion in conjunction with a word which allows greater communication for infants. Writing on the topic, Jane Collingwood states that "Infants from about six months of age can begin to learn the basic signs, which cover such objects and concepts as "thirsty", "milk", "water", "hungry", "sleepy", "pacifier", "more", "hot", "cold", "play", "bath", and "teddy bear"." Typically developing children will produce their first gestures between the ages of 9 and 12 months without any prompting or assistance from a caregiver. Infants learn how to use their body language, eye gaze, and hand gestures as a way to attract attention and communicate. Once children gain some language production, they will couple language with gesture to further communicate. Gesture remains present in all individuals at any age which is a distinguishing factor from baby sign.

== Pros and cons ==
=== Suggested benefits ===
Baby sign promotes communication before a child is able to verbally communicate with others. Since gestures are part of normal speech, teaching baby sign allows infants to learn an aspect of communication that is used with language. It is not, however designed to replace language. This demonstrates that infants are able to learn gestures before mastering verbal skills. Therefore, those who learn these simplified signs may enhance their cognitive development by gaining language skills through both visual and auditory modes.

In an article in The Psychologist, Gwyneth Doherty-Sneddon has considered in detail the theory behind the growth of this phenomenon and some of the claims made by its supporters. Doherty-Sneddon points out that baby sign is not entirely new. Variations have been used by speech and language therapists for decades with children who have impairments to either their speech, cognitive abilities, or both. It is widely recognized that communication is at the heart of cognitive, social, emotional, and behavioral development in children. Baby sign may assist in improving these significant developmental functions.

Baby signs create mutual attention between the parent and child leading to further elaboration of what the infant is communicating. A study collected self-reports from mothers who had engaged in a baby sign training workshop, to clarify whether or not signing with their child would create added parental stress and/or enhance parent-child communication. Overall the parents did not express feeling heightened stress or frustration from the baby sign training process but rather they reported a greater ability to understand their child. This richer communication was found to lead to a more positive interaction with their child which overall benefits the establishment of an earlier parent-child bond.

Children who learned enhanced symbolic gestures performed better on both expressive and receptive verbal language tests compared to those who had not been encouraged to learn such gestures. Receptive language means being able to recognize words and signs, while expressive language involves the process of forming words or signs. Research has shown that enhanced gesture input for hearing children is the first step toward successfully mastering gesture use, and the use of representational form and symbolic communicative function. Improved symbolic gestures may contribute to language development by providing children with increased knowledge of concepts by explaining the functions of the objects that they are exposed to. In support of expressive language development studies have shown that learning symbolic gestures can lead to advanced verbal development and accelerated language acquisition. An effective baby sign workshop also resulted in the improvement of numerous areas of development by comparing the child's results before and after the workshop. Some of these areas included communicative, cognitive, social, adaptive behavior, physical, and fine motor skill development of children. This enhancement however, is short-lived (from between 12 and 15 months of age). Doherty-Sneddon argues, however, that this timescale represents only a general norm. The enhancement and advantage is far more extended in the many toddlers who do not speak until well after their second birthdays.

Doherty-Sneddon also states a key issue is ensuring that sufficient and appropriately designed research is available to back the claims made in relation to baby signing. A literature review concluded that although benefits were reported in 13 of 17 studies, various weaknesses in the methods used for baby sign studies leave the evidence unsupported. Certainly, research into the effects of baby signing needs better control groups, such as children who are involved in equally interesting and fun activities based around adult and child language interaction, but not baby signing. This suggestion for further research implies that it may not be the baby signs themselves that facilitate language development but rather the underlying benefit being active, joint attention that is stimulated by baby sign.

Therefore, the enhanced joint visual attention during parent-child interaction empowers the infant to focus the topic and context of the conversation, clarify concepts, and creates added practice with symbolic interaction. These underlying mechanisms of baby sign are proposed to create benefits for the infant such as; enhancing vocabulary, advancing cognitive development, reducing tantrums and frustration, and improving the parent-child relationship and communication. More specifically language development is improved by advancing comprehension, promoting literacy and successfully allowing the infant to express their needs so the parent becomes more responsive and observant of their baby.

=== Why it may be neither beneficial nor harmful ===
Researchers have suggested the possibility of parents and experimenters being overly liberal in attributing sign or word status to early attempts at communication by children. Puccini and Liszkowski found that when infants associate labels with objects, they use verbal cues more frequently than gestures to make these associations. The process of further facilitating gesturing with baby signs is suggested to possibly cause interference toward children's mapping of these words. This may be a result of infants lacking enough attention to take in these two types of information and process it at the same time. It is suggested that these labels, and further through the facilitation of baby sign, that it is unlikely that baby sign is facilitating speech development in infants.

Baby sign programs encourage parents to improve their communication skills between themselves and their infants before they have developed speech. Kirk and colleagues have found that the results of their study with hearing infants provided no evidence to support that a child's language development would benefit from learning baby sign. They also found that children who participated in baby sign had similar language development to children who did not learn baby sign. It is suggested that participating in baby sign may be an unnecessary effort with infants when being motivated by the hopes of advanced language learning for the child. However, it was found that mothers who used baby sign with their infants encouraged increased independence with them and supported a higher level of independence for their child. Another conducted research study has shown that there are no significant differences found with language acquisition between infants who are receiving or not receiving exposure to baby sign, including reaching language milestones. Although no support for using baby sign was found in this study, there was also no negative effects found to be associated with language development when using baby sign with your child. It is possible that baby sign is working in support of infant's spoken language, but was not found to further their later language development.

The results of multiple studies regarding baby sign have found that the advantages provided do not go beyond children over the age of two years old. The results of this literature review have not shown support that baby sign increases a child's linguistic development. When teaching a child baby sign, an infant's attention is directed away from what they are interested in and is redirected towards the adult and the desired sign. This interaction has been claimed to increase joint attention between parent and child, but has yet to be studied enough in research literature. It has also been proposed by researchers that baby sign may increase parental stress rather than decrease it because of busy lifestyles that may be disrupting interactions between parents and children. Teaching baby sign outside of research settings does not allow for the parent to raise questions or concerns to trained individuals. Reaching fundamental linguistic milestones and the natural course of children's language development has been suggested to be disrupted because of the unnatural intervention in language development that baby sign provides, supported by the lack of support in prior studies which have been analyzed.

== Learning baby sign ==
There are numerous concepts to keep in mind when encouraging baby sign. Caregivers should ensure that they have their infant's attention, maintain consistency with what sign is used and how it is used in relation to an item, repeat signs often, encourage the infant, and be alert to recognize when the infant is signing back.

When it comes to infants who have not yet acquired language abilities, signs are an easy and readily accessible form of communication. Prior to infants learning specific signs or developing language skills, they acquire the spontaneous use of gesture. An infant's first gesture may appear between 9–12 months of age, often classified as pointing. Gesturing gradually increases as infants connect pointing to word meaning, making a gesture-plus-word combination that will evolve into a two word combination. It is thought that gestures may be easier for infants to remember than a name alone since a gesture is representative of what the child can picture happening, when thinking about the item.

To determine how infant communication is influenced by gesture and speech, Iverson and Goldin-Meadow conducted a study. Infants in the study used eye gaze, body position, and vocalization to attract and direct their target audience's attention, while gesturing to items. Results looked to see if the gestures that children use are related to the word they say while doing the gesture. Iverson and Goldin-Meadow found that infants gesture for items that they did not have the ability to express with words. When words were produced by the child, they typically were ones that the child had already been gesturing for. This shows that gesture is directly linked to the words that children will produce.

Symbolic gesture is the specific term that encompasses baby sign. This form of gesture aids in communication through the use of hand movements that represent an item or feeling. Infants are quick to note if there is a connection between an item and a symbolic gesture. Once they make the connection infants will imitate actions that are produced by the caregiver. Consistency from the caregiver is crucial during the teaching and feedback stage in order for infants to learn from repetition. This repetition applies to how the caregiver uses the sign and in what way the sign is associated with the object or emotion. If the association changes then the child will have a harder time understanding how the symbolic gesture links to the item. One way for caregivers to ensure the infant associates the symbolic gesture with the object or emotion is to gain the infant's attention, and say the name of the object at the same time that the sign is performed.

Infants watch their caregiver during everyday routines and situations. This observation allows infants to learn symbols by borrowing the actions from the observed routine. A natural association occurs between signs and items, allowing infants to explore and express new ideas prior to language development. Infants will learn to associate a word with the general motion that they carry out while using an object, such as throwing a ball. After this association children begin to make connections with the word and motion alone, in this case a throwing gesture. Infants now can make the throwing gesture to alert caregivers that they wish to throw a ball, thus increasing their non-verbal communication. Representative abilities such as these are further used by infants to demonstrate emotional feelings as they associate a motion or sign with a feeling.

Further studies demonstrate that increasing the use of gesture, not necessarily use of a sign language, can increase the richness of a child's linguistic development. It is suggested that learning signs happens over a period of time, inferring the importance of caregivers being patient with children as it takes more than a brief interaction between parent and child. Parent-child interactions are vital to the learning of baby sign since the infant looks to the caregiver for guidance. By consciously demonstrating the sign to the infant, the caregiver and infant are sustaining joint attention which increases communication. When caregivers aid infants in creating the sign with their hands, they are further increasing encouragement, repetition, and communication. It is the caregiver's job to not only teach specific hand signals, beyond what infants naturally pick up, but to provide support and feedback to infants when signs are produced correctly. Through making a connection, and parental encouragement of that connection, infants can learn and actively engage in baby sign language.

In 1998, a program was conducted at A. Sophie Rogers Infant-Toddler Laboratory School in Ohio State University by Kimberlee Whaley. Certain signs used in American Sign Language were taught to infants, along with their teachers, to establish whether these signs could be used to increase effective communication with the very young children. From about the age of 9 months, the children began to use the signs they had learned; these included words like "eat", "juice", "more", "now", and "sleep". The program found that children would also use the signs they learned in the classroom to communicate with parents at home. Based on this study, learning baby sign appears to be a beneficial tool for children if implemented in schools and day cares.

== Media and Internet influences ==
Due to promotional products, easy access to baby sign tutorial videos, and representations in popular culture, parental attempts at signing with their baby may be more focused on the popularity social aspects instead of an intention to potentially enhance their child's communication skills.

A study examined the degree to which information about baby sign found on the internet was based on research. Results found thirty-three websites that all promoted baby sign and the benefits associated. Over 90% of the information referred to opinion articles or promotional products encouraging parents to sign, with little to no basis in research. Although websites claim that using baby sign will reduce tantrums, increase infant's self-esteem, satisfaction, feelings of accomplishment, increase parent-child bonding, and decrease frustration, the sites do not provide enough research-based evidence to support these claims.

Another study examined internet information found using Google Scholar as well as a few academic databases. Researchers examined whether results claimed baby sign encouraged developmental, social, cognitive, and language skills while achieving a greater bond between parent and child. The goal of asking this question was to find information that allows parents, caregivers, childhood educators, and clinicians to make informed decisions about the amount of emphasis to place on baby sign. When all the cited material was gathered there were 1747 articles with only 10 articles providing research regarding infant's developmental outcome in connection to baby sign. Consensus gathered from these 10 articles states that baby sign, as used by the commercially advertised product authored by Acredolo and Goodwyn, does not benefit language production or parent-child relationships. However, there is also no evidence from these articles that baby sign is in any way harmful to infants. Through these two studies it is illustrated that websites may not contain 100% research based information. Individuals looking for information regarding the pros and cons of using baby sign should ensure they are accessing sites backed by research and not opinion.

Commercial products available to parents participating in baby sign workshops or implementing it at home, are found to be comparable to the quality of products used in research studies. It is suggested that parents be cautious of baby sign products as it is difficult to assess the credibility of commercialized products for facilitating baby sign.

== Images ==
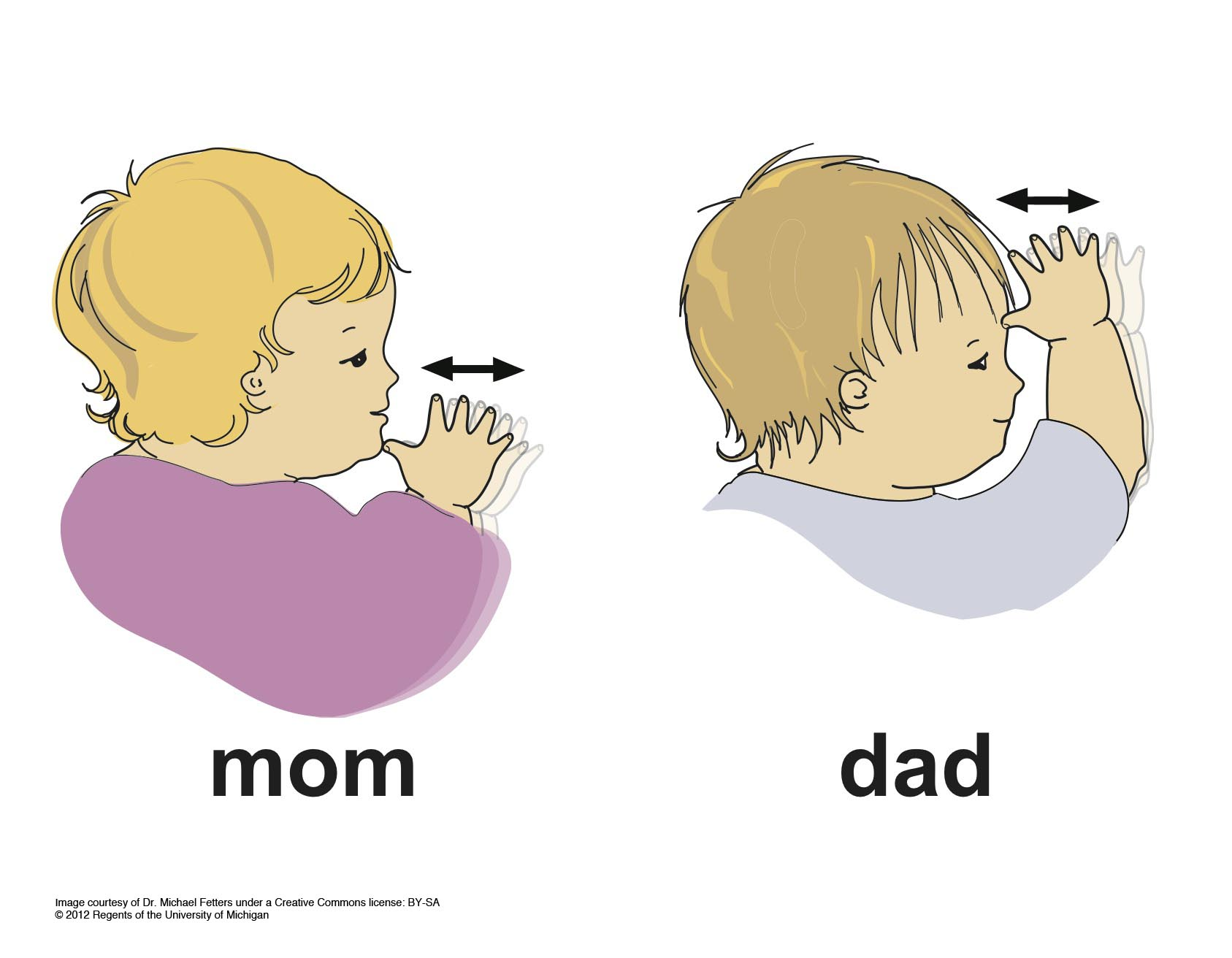

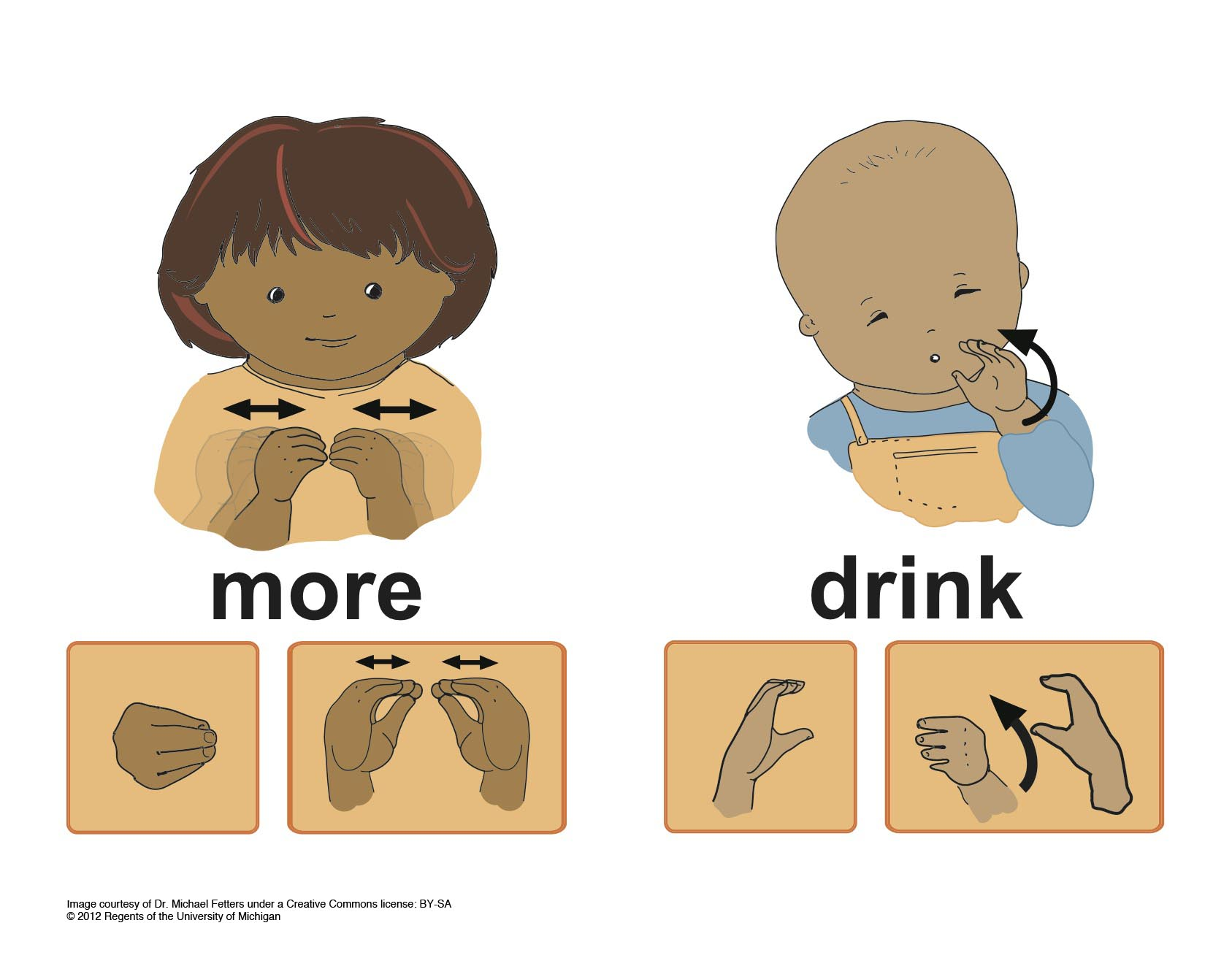

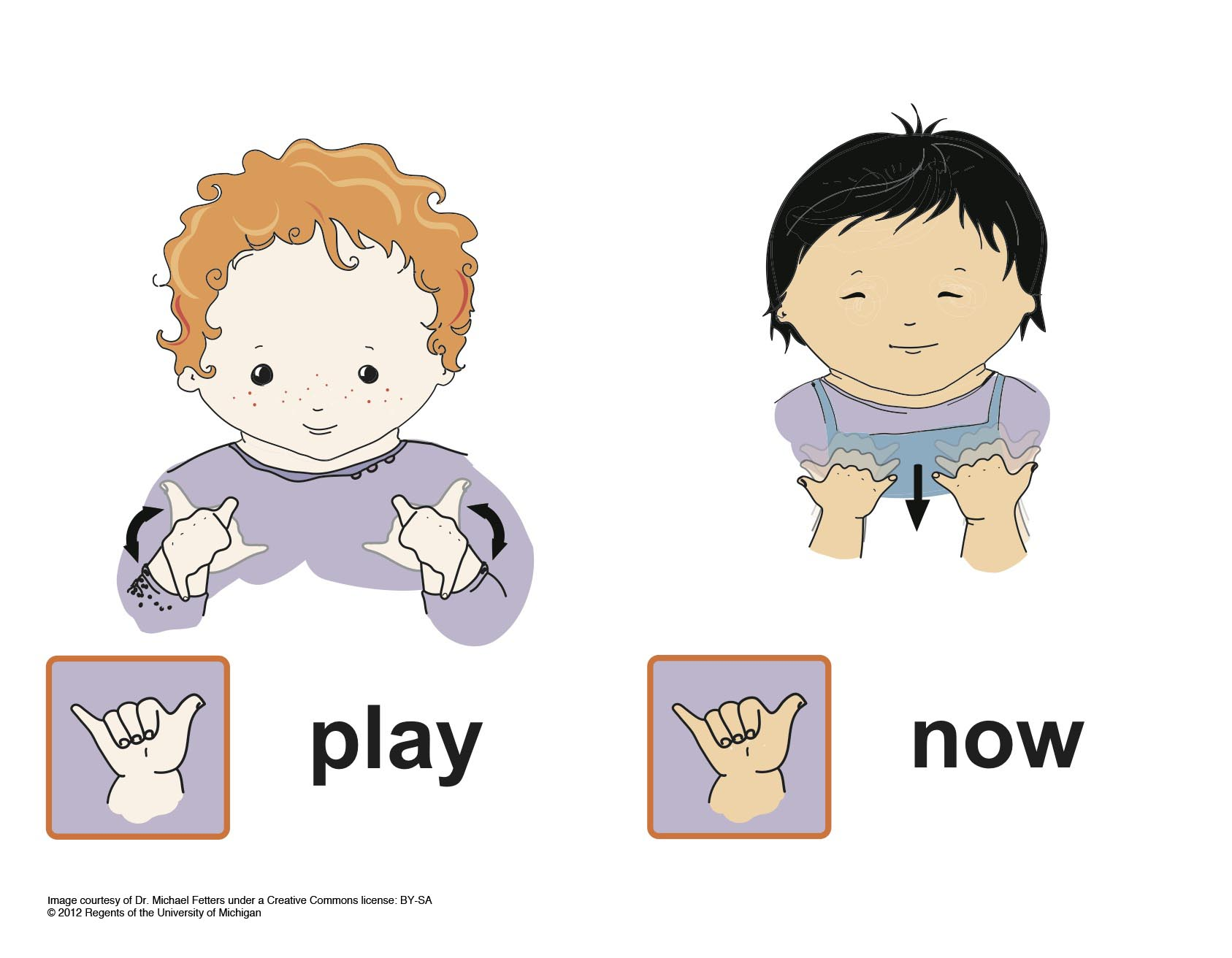

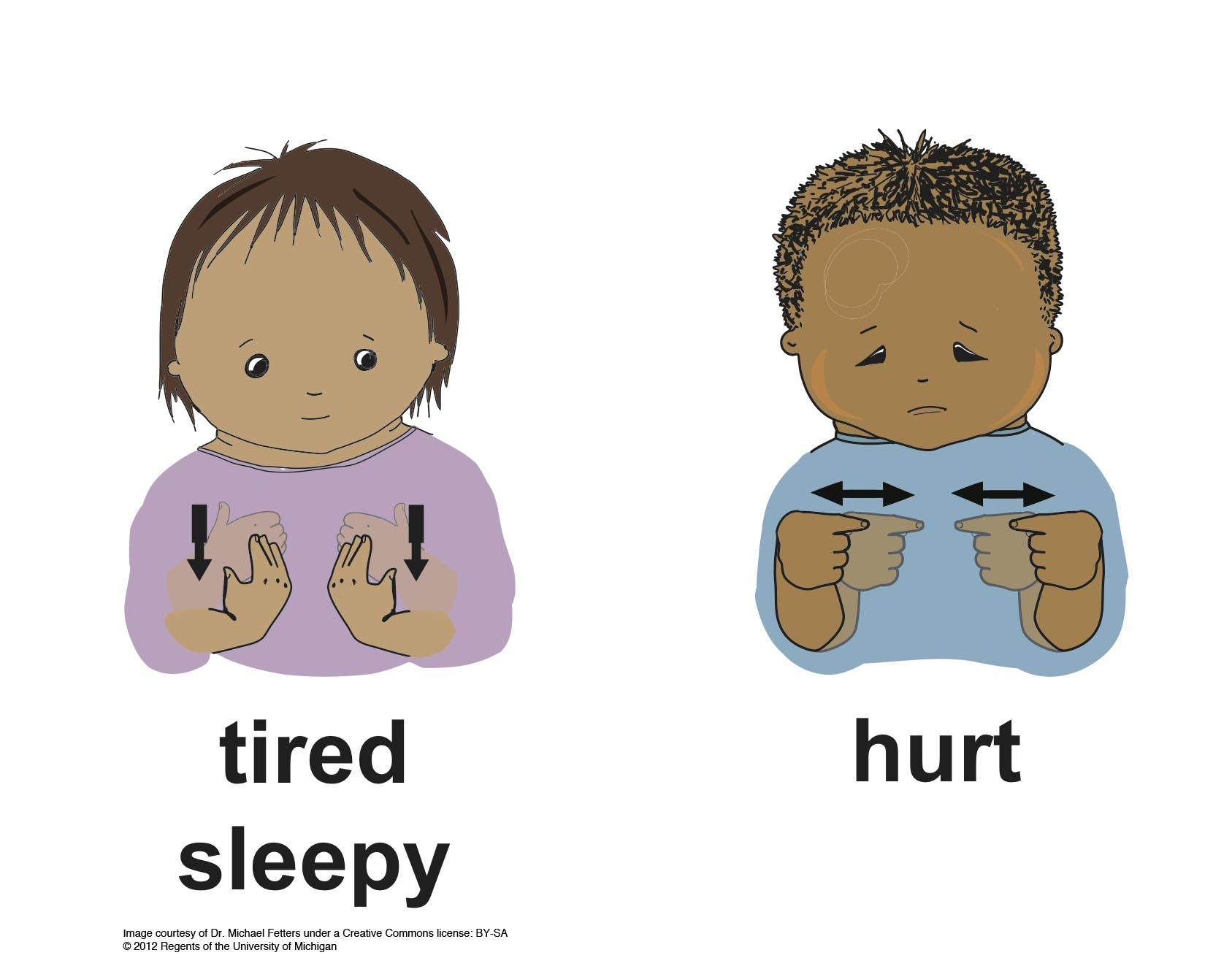

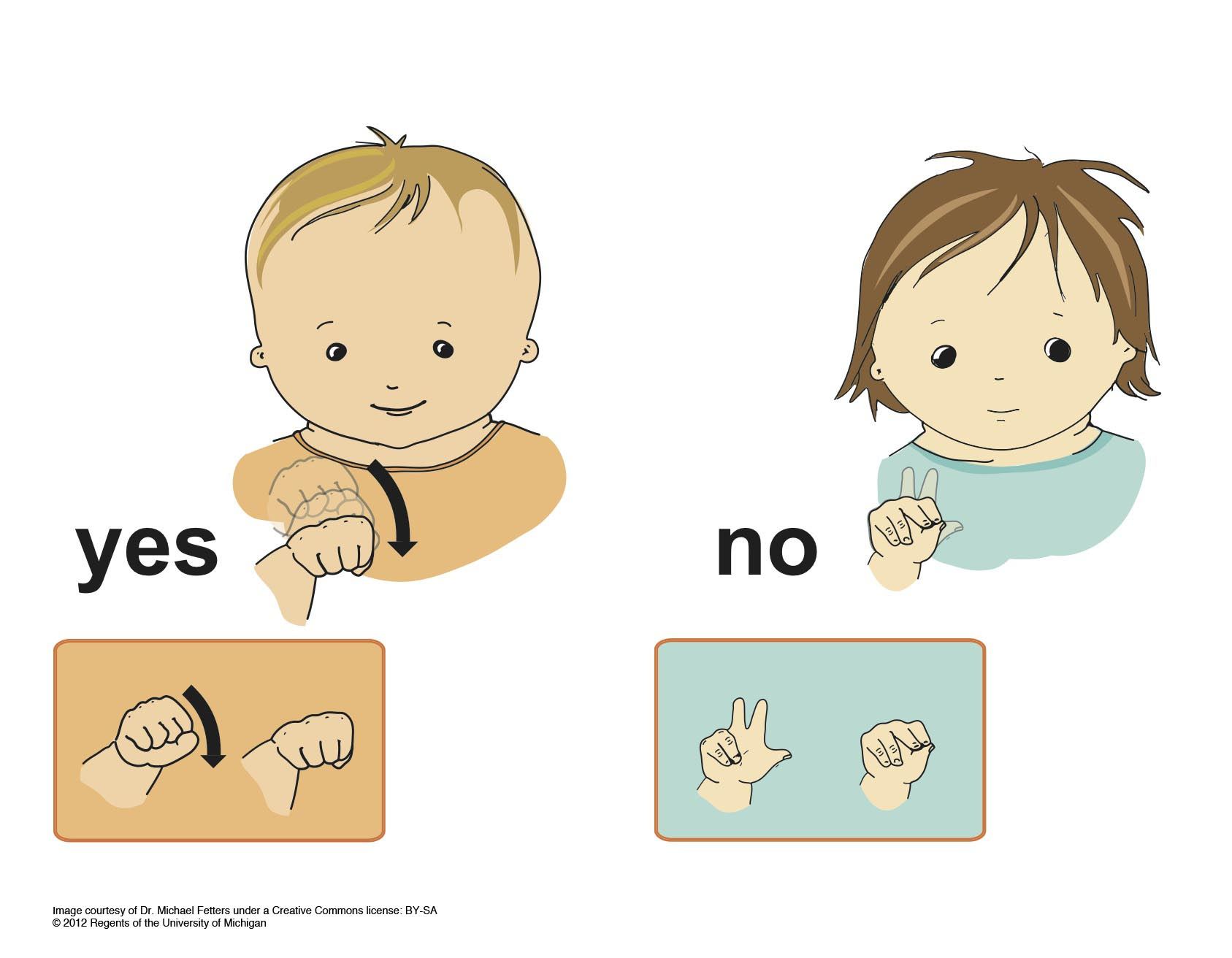

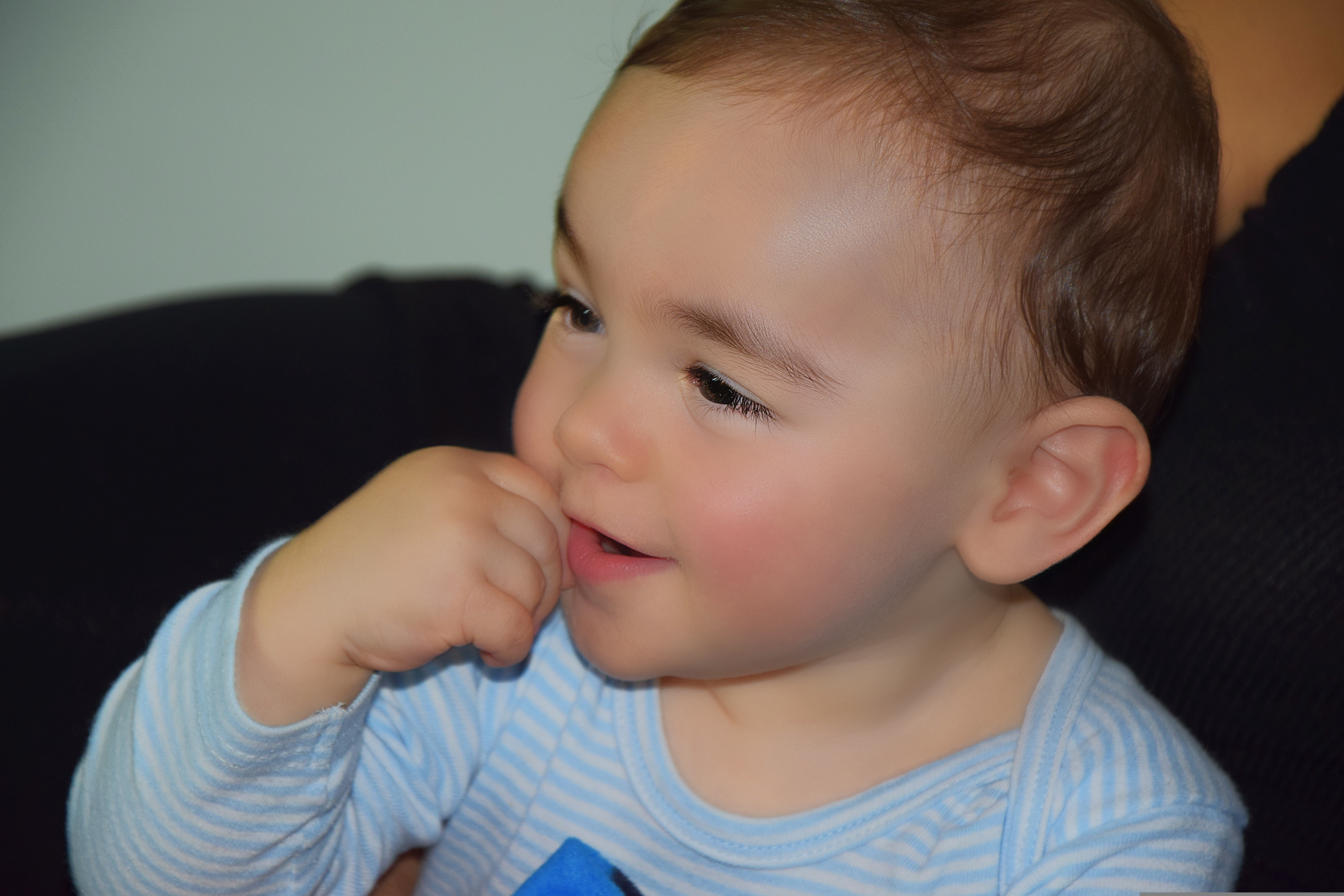
Young boy asking for food

== See also ==
- Child development
- The Connected Baby (documentary film)
- Language acquisition
- Signing Time!
- Manual babbling
- Gestures in language acquisition
- Baby talk
- Oralism
- Signalong
