= Adult interaction with infants =

When adults come into contact with infants, the adult often changes their persona (and communicates in a way they would not with other adults) in order to try to elicit a reaction from the infant, to teach them life lessons, or to physically stimulate them. They may simplify their speech to concise sentences or words for them to repeat, or speak in nonsensical phrases (known as baby talk). They may make simple movements with their finger (such as circles) on objects for them to copy, or point to brand names/logos or people in family photos to see if they identify them. They may also choose to play one of various games, many of which are old favourites (such as Where's the baby? or Got your nose!). While the parents or carers may or may not choose to do this when alone with the child, when in the presence of guests the conversation tends to either divert completely to this type of interaction or at least have these forms of interaction take place as asides in the conversation. Sometimes the interaction is one-sided, with the adult taking satisfaction with their attempts, even though the infant does not react, or react without really understanding it. At other times, the interaction is two-sided, and both parties derive pleasure or other emotions from it. Some adults do not change at all when in the presence of other families' infants.

== Parents and infants ==
An article in Science Daily suggested that "the way mothers interact with their babies in the first year of life is strongly related to how children behave later on."

"No [grownup conversation or alcohol] can go down [at an adult-only party] when there are kids...Once a baby's in the mix, it's almost guaranteed that all the attention (especially [the parents']) is focused on the little one instead of the grown-up activities."

— Denene Millner, Reality Check: Bringing Baby to an Adults-Only Party

Sometimes when caring mothers invite guests over, they become preoccupied with their child's needs, even though the infants are disruptive to the atmosphere and attention-stealing. Alex Richards recalled a post-baby party where her "two-month-old was good for a while, but became fussier and fussier as the night progressed". Sometimes, adults ignore the infants, finding them to be a nuisance or irrelevant. When this happens, they are put into playpens to fend for themselves, or left to wander the house. Amy Bowman recalls that at a dinner party, she put her 8-month-old down, and "as soon as she hit the ground, Katie 'sprinted' on all fours to the edge of the patio and pulled herself to standing on a lounge chair", rather than conversing with the adults.

== Games ==
Playing games with babies can assist with:^{[broken link]}

- Bonding
- Motor control and hand/eye coordination
- Fine and gross motor skills
- Digestion and relieving constipation
- Social skills and emotional development
- Sensory development
- Language and vocab development

=== Types of games ===
Babycenter.com identifies the following games for adults to play with babies.

- Copycat: Sticking your tongue out and waiting for them to stick their tongue back in response. They can try other facial expressions such as a smile or laugh. Once the baby is more experienced, one can try things like clapping their hands or waving for the baby to imitate.
- Tickle songs: Singing songs like This Little Piggy or Round and Round the Garden and tickling them at the end. After repetition, the infant will "start...to giggle in excited anticipation of [it]". Games like this improve infants' memory skills.
- Roll and stretch: When the baby starts being able to raise their hand when lying on their stomach, they can roll "a brightly colored ball across [their] line of vision about 60cm from [their] body". They will stretch towards it. This exercise strengthens their neck, arm and leg muscles.
- Catch me: Dangling a toy-on-a-string (preferably squeaky) in front of the baby's eyes, or the infant to touch and/or grab. This exercise helps to build hand–eye co-ordination.
- Bubble magic: As infants are fascinated by bubbles, one can play various bubble-related games such as blowing bubbles at them with a bubble-blowing toy. They can learn about cause and effect, by touching bubbles and watching them pop.
- Puppet show: Putting on a puppet show for them. Making the puppets sing, dance, tickle and kiss etc. helps develop their imagination.
- In and out: Because babies like to empty things (like handbags or boxes of tissues), one can create a game out of this by filling a large container or bowl with safe interesting objects. With the baby, empty it and play with the objects. They can learn about size, shape, weight, big, small, empty and full.
- Adventure playground: Making a "miniature obstacle course out of cushions...and peeping out from behind them", place toys around the floor for them to navigate their way through. This exercise helps develop their body strength, balance and co-ordination.
- Kick ball: Placing a small ball in front of the infant and encouraging them to kick it by picking them up by the arms and moving their leg towards the ball. This swinging action builds stomach and leg muscles.
- Tower power: Using old or unused items like cereal boxes, lightweight books or plastic bowls, and make a tower out of them, for the infant to then knock down. They learn about shapes and sizes, and derive pleasure from watching the tower fall apart.

Some other games are as follows:

- Music Fun Turn on some kid songs or tunes and help the baby move and clap to the rhythm of the music by letting the baby mimic your movements.
- Looking in the Mirror Take a mirror and put it in front of the baby so they can see their reflection for fun.
- Hide & Seek Go hide one of the baby's favorite toy then take the baby with you to go find the toy.
- Roll Ball It's for fun the kid if you just keep rolling a ball to a baby and let the baby push the ball back. Will help the baby gain motor skills.
- Looking fun Go outside with your baby and let the baby enjoy the beauties of nature like the grass, flowers, trees, and the neighbor hoods animals which will probably fascinate the child.
- Music From the Kitchen Making different types of sounds or music from the kitchen using tools like your pots and pans will help the child's sensory development of sound.
- Outside Fun Let your kid go outside to the park or backyard so the baby can feel the outdoors. Letting the infant crawl on the grass, feel the wind, and smell the sweet odors from the flowers.

== In Media ==
- The Connected Baby, a documentary film

== Baby talk ==
Baby talk or parentese (when done by a parent) is speech that is modified for communication with babies. It is usually high-pitched, with exaggerated vowels and a simplified vocabulary. Most adults, including those who have never had children themselves, will switch to baby talk when interacting with a very young child.

"When talking with children, it is important that the conversation arises from a genuine interest. In other words carers must want to be with children, talk with the children and find out what they are thinking. Displaying a genuine interest and enjoyment in spending time with children also shows that you value and respect them".

— Jan Faulkner, Taking with Babies and Toddlers
