= Creep Mouse =

Children's game

Creep Mouse is an informal game played with babies. In the game, one (child, teenager, or adult) marching his or her two fingers up from the infant's toes towards the baby's midsection, reciting a rhythmic verse something like “Here, comes, the, creep, mouse, from, the, barn, into, the, house” once the walking fingers reach the midsection, the baby is then tickled and the sounds “giddy giddy getchya” are made, much to the baby's amusement. This game is often repeated with an increased cadence with each round.

In the United Kingdom, this game is played along to the song Round and round the garden.

== See also ==
- Infant metaphysics
- Creepmouse "timid" etc. on Wiktionary
