= Fingerplay =

Children's game combining hand action with singing or speech

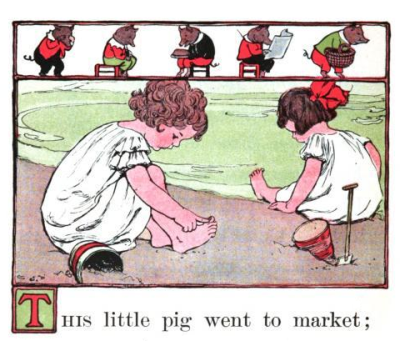
Children playing This Little Pig.

Fingerplay, commonly seen in early childhood, is hand action or movement combined with singing or spoken-words to engage the child's interest. According to Erikson, many children develop autonomy and "want to learn and imitate the activities and behavior of others". According to Wong's Essentials of Pediatric Nursing, "gestures precedes speech and in this way a child communicates satisfactorily". From ages three to four, children become active listeners and can control their eyes, body, and attention on the teacher.

Some chants or nursery rhymes that incorporate fingerplay include the "Itsy Bitsy Spider", "Round and round the garden", and "This Little Piggy". The gestural components of the rhymes serve to attract the child's attention, and reciting chants or stories can help a child to develop an ear for sounds, and discover that they can be manipulated and changed. They can also help children develop such skills as fine motor co-ordination and following directions.

An example of a fingerplay poem is "Five Little Monkeys":

Five little monkeys (five fingers)
Jumping on the bed—(rest elbow on other hand, jump arm up and down)
One fell off, (hold up one finger, bring down as if falling)
And bumped his head. (hand to head)
