= This Little Piggy =

Nursery rhyme

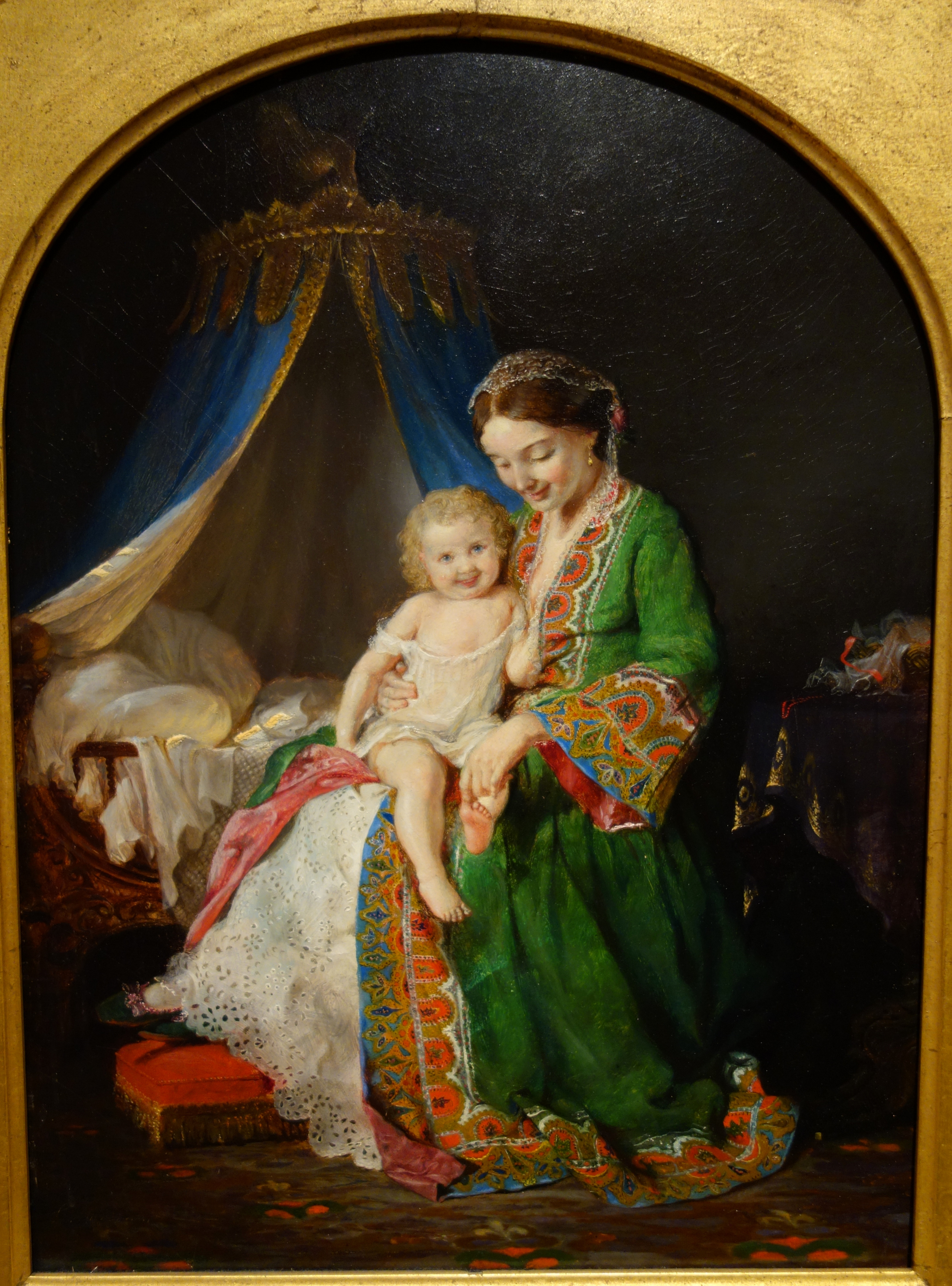
- Illustration by Lilly Martin Spencer, 1857

Nursery rhyme
- Published: 1760
- Songwriter: Unknown

"This Little Pig Went to Market" (often shortened to "This Little Piggy") is an English-language nursery rhyme and fingerplay. It has a Roud Folk Song Index number of 19297.

== Lyrics ==
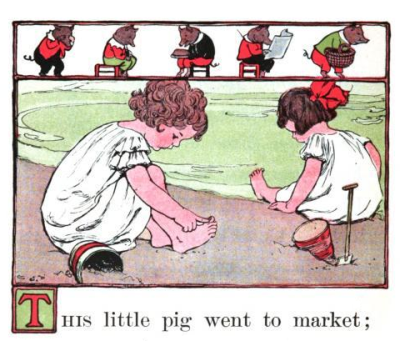
Children playing This Little Pig.

The rhyme is usually counted out on an infant or toddler's toes, each line corresponding to a different toe, usually starting with the big toe and ending with the little toe.

One popular version is:

Words

This little piggy went to market,
This little piggy stayed home,
This little piggy had roast beef,
This little piggy had none,
This little piggy cried "Wee! Wee! Wee!" all the way home.

Fingerplay

Wiggle the "big" toe
Wiggle the "long" toe
Wiggle the "middle" toe
Wiggle the "ring" toe
Wiggle the "little" toe and tickle the bottom of the foot

== Origins ==
In 1728, the first line of the rhyme appeared in a medley called "The Nurses Song". The first known full version was recorded in The Famous Tommy Thumb's Little Story-Book, published in London about 1760. In this book, the rhyme goes:

This pig went to market,
That pig stayed home;
This pig had roast meat,
That pig had none;
This pig went to the barn's door,
And cried week, week for more.

The full rhyme continued to appear, with slight variations, in many late 18th- and early 19th-century collections. Until the mid-20th century, the lines referred to "little pigs". It was the eighth most popular nursery rhyme in a 2009 survey in the United Kingdom.

== See also ==
- Works related to This Little Pig at Wikisource
