= Gestures in language acquisition =

Aspect of non-verbal communication

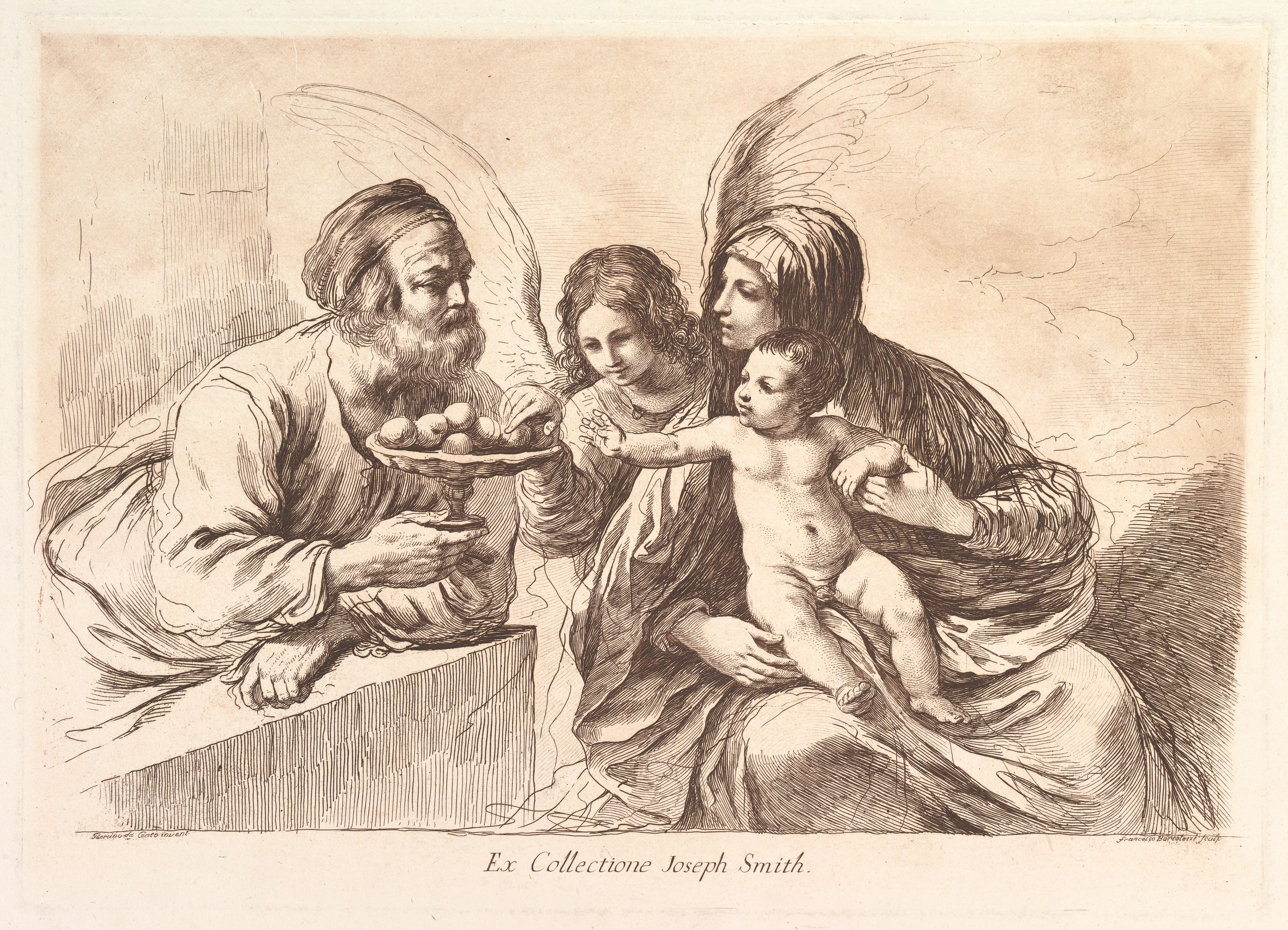
Jesus reaching for a plate of fruit held by Joseph, an angel gesturing toward the fruit, published in 'Raccolta di alcuni disegni del Barbieri da Cento detto il Guernico,' Rome, 1764

Gestures in language acquisition are a form of non-verbal communication involving movements of the hands, arms, and/or other parts of the body. Children can use gesture to communicate before they have the ability to use spoken words and phrases. In this way gestures can prepare children to learn a spoken language, creating a bridge from pre-verbal communication to speech. The onset of gesture has also been shown to predict and facilitate children's spoken language acquisition. Once children begin to use spoken words their gestures can be used in conjunction with these words to form phrases and eventually to express thoughts and complement vocalized ideas.

Gestures not only complement language development but also enhance the child’s ability to communicate. Gestures allow the child to convey a message or thought that they would not be able to easily express using their limited vocabulary. Children's gestures are classified into different categories occurring in different stages of development. The categories of children's gesture include deictic and representational gestures.

== Signs versus gestures ==
Gestures are distinct from manual signs in that they do not belong to a complete language system. For example, pointing through the extension of a body part, especially the index finger to indicate interest in an object is a widely used gesture that is understood by many cultures On the other hand, manual signs are conventionalized—they are gestures that have become a lexical element in a language. A good example of manual signing is American Sign Language (ASL)–when individuals communicate via ASL, their signs have meanings that are equivalent to words (e.g., two people communicating using ASL both understand that forming a fist with your right hand and rotating this fist using clockwise motions on the chest carries the lexical meaning of the word "sorry").

== Deictic gestures ==
Typically, the first gestures children show around 10 to 12 months of age are deictic gestures. These gestures are also known as pointing where children extend their index finger, although any other body part could also be used, to single out an object of interest. Deictic gestures occur across cultures and indicate that infants are aware of what other people pay attention to. Pre-verbal children use pointing for many different reasons, such as responding to or answering questions and/or sharing their interests and knowledge with others.

There are three main functions to infant's pointing:

1. Imperative – this type of deictic gesture develops first and children use it to obtain something (the speech equivalent would be saying "give me that").
2. Declarative – this type of deictic gesture develops later than imperative gestures and directs an adult's attention to an object or event to indicate its existence (the speech equivalent would be saying "look at that"). Declarative pointing is expressive and can be used by the child to draw attention to an interesting object and share this interest with another person. Declarative pointing can also be informative where the child is providing the other person with information. This type of gesture is typically absent in autistic children's gesture repertoires.
3. Epistemic – this type of deictic gesture also develops after imperative gestures and may develop at the same time as declarative gestures. These types of gestures serve as an epistemic request wherein infants may point to an object in order for an adult to provide new information, like a name, to an object (the speech equivalent would be saying "what is that").

The existence of deictic gestures that are declarative and epistemic in nature reflects another important part of children's development, the development of joint visual attention. Joint visual attention occurs when a child and an adult are both paying attention to the same object. Joint attention through the use of pointing is considered a precursor to speech development because it reveals that children want to communicate with another person. Furthermore, the amount of pointing at 12 months old predicts speech production and comprehension rates at 24 months old. In children with autism spectrum disorder, the use of right-handed gestures—particularly deictic gestures—reliably predicts their expressive vocabularies 1 year later—a pattern also observed in typically-developing children.

Once children can produce spoken words they often use deictic gestures to create sentence-like phrases. These phrases occur when a child, for example, says the word "eat" and then points to a cookie. The incidence of these gesture-word combinations predicts the transition from one-word to two-word speech. This shows that gesture can maximize the communicative opportunities that children can have before their speech is fully developed facilitating their entrance into lexical and syntactic development.

== Representational gestures ==
Representational gesture refers to an object, person, location, or event with hand movement, body movement, or facial expression. Representational gestures can be divided into iconic and conventional gestures. Unlike deictic gestures, representational gestures communicate a specific meaning. Children start to produce representational gestures at 10 to 24 months of age. Young American children will produce more deictic gestures than representational gestures, but Italian children will produce almost equal amounts of representational and deictic gestures.

=== Iconic gestures ===
Iconic gestures have visually similar relationship to the action, object, or attribute they portray. There is an increase in iconic gesturing after the two-word utterance stage at 26 months. Children are able to create novel iconic gestures when they were attempting to inform the listener of information they think the listener does not know. Iconic gestures aided language development after the two-word utterance stage, whereas deictic gestures did not. Iconic gestures are the most common form of representational gesture in Italian children. Children will copy the iconic gestures they see their parents using, therefore including iconic gestures when measuring representational vocabularies increases Italian children's vocabularies. Even though the Italian children produced more iconic gestures, the two-word utterance stage did not arrive earlier than American children who produce fewer iconic gestures.

=== Conventional gestures ===
Conventional gestures are culture-bound emblems that do not translate across different cultures. Culture-specific gestures such as shaking your head "no" or waving "goodbye" are considered conventional gestures. Although American children do not typically produce many representational gestures in general, conventional gestures are the most frequently used in the representational gesture category.

== Timeline of gesture development ==
Like most developmental timelines it is important to consider that no two children develop at the same pace. Infant gesture is thought to be an important part of the prelinguistic period and prepares a child for the emergence of language. It has been suggested that language and gesture develop in interaction with one another. It is believed that gestures are easier to produce for both infants and adults; this is supported by the fact that infants begin to communicate with gestures before they can produce words. The first type of gestures that appear in infants are deictic gestures. Deictic gestures include pointing, which is often the most common gesture produced at ten months of age. At eleven months of age children can produce a sequence of 2 gestures, usually a deictic gesture with a conventional or representational gesture. and by twelve months of age children can begin to produce 3-gestures in sequence usually a representational or conventional gesture that is preceded and followed by a deictic gesture. Around twelve months of age, infants begin to use representational gestures. In relation to language acquisition, representational gestures appear around the same time as first words. At age 18 months children produce more deictic gestures than representational gestures. Between the first and second year of life, children begin to learn more words and use gestures less. At 26 months of age, there is an increase in iconic gesture use and comprehension. Gestures become more complex as children get older. Between age 4-6 children can use whole body gestures when describing a route. A whole body gesture occurs in three-dimensional space and is used when the speaker is describing a route as if they are on it. At ages 5–6, children also describe a route from a bird's eye view and use representational gestures from this point of view. The ways in which gestures are used are an indication of the developmental or conceptual ability of children.

== Augmentative and alternative communication ==
Not only do gestures play an important role in the natural development of spoken language, but they also are a major factor in augmentative and alternative communication (AAC). AAC refers to the methods, tools, and theories to use non-standard linguistic forms of communication by and with individuals without or with limited functional speech. Means used to communicate in AAC can span from high-tech computer-based communication devices, to low-tech means such as one-message switches, to non-tech means such as picture cards, manual signs, and gestures. It is only within the last two decades that the importance of gestures in the cognitive and linguistic development processes has been examined, and in particular the gesture's functionality for individuals with communication disorders, especially AAC users.

== See also ==
- Baby sign language
- Child development
- Language acquisition
- List of gestures
- Nonverbal communication
