= Benign neonatal seizures =

Benign neonatal seizures include two disorders: self-limited (benign) neonatal seizures and self-limited (benign) familial neonatal seizures.

== Self-limited neonatal seizures ==
Self-limited neonatal seizures are a diagnosis of exclusion. 90% occur within the first 4-6 days of life, thus coining the term "fifth day fits". Seizures typically resolve by six weeks of life. Some suspected etiologies include rotavirus infections, de-novo (first time) mutations in genes encoding for voltage-gated potassium channels (KCNQ2, KCNQ3), and acute zinc deficiency in cerebrospinal fluid.

=== Presentation ===
Most frequently the seizure is focal tonic and involves the head, face, and limbs. Focal tonic seizures are defined as sustained flexion or extension of muscle groups. Focal clonic seizures can also occur, which are defined as rhythmic movements of muscle groups. Seizures can alternate sides and progress to bilateral tonic seizures. There may also be associated apnea in a third of patients. The duration of the seizure is typically 1-3 minutes but may evolve to status epilepticus, a medical emergency in which a seizure lasts longer than five minutes.

=== Diagnosis ===
The patient should be evaluated for a broad range of etiologies, including basic testing starting with a thorough history and examination, labs, blood culture, lumbar puncture, urine culture, and neuroimaging. Additional testing should be done to evaluate for congenital infections, metabolic disturbances, inborn errors of metabolism, drug withdrawal, and trauma. Given this is a diagnosis of exclusion, diagnosis should include no family history of neonatal seizures or epilepsy, appropriate APGAR score, and normal neurological exam and neuroimaging findings.

=== Treatment ===
Anti-seizure medications are acutely administered. Treatment includes phenobarbital, benzodiazepines, levetiracetam, and phenytoin. These medications can be given alone or in combination. Additionally, phenytoin/fosphenytoin or carbamazepine (sodium channel blockers) are especially efficient for managing patients with a diagnosed channelopathy. Long-term management is not required and anti-seizure medications can be stopped once beyond the six week period of recurrence risk.

== Self-limited familial neonatal seizures ==
Self-limited familial neonatal seizures are autosomal dominant in inheritance and involve mutations in voltage-gated potassium channels, KCNQ2 and KCNQ3. Up to 15% of carriers may be symptomatic. There may be cases of later-onset seizures or more severe epilepsy syndromes associated with a mutation in SCN2A, which encodes for voltage-gated sodium channels.

=== Presentation/Diagnosis ===
Similar to non-familial neonatal seizures, familial seizures may be focal, multifocal clonic, or tonic. The key to diagnosis is a family history of similar events and a normal neurological exam. Seizures occur between a few days to a few weeks of life and resolve by 5 months of age (range 5 days to 2 years). An EEG taken between seizures is typically normal. Diagnostic testing is similar to that of self-limited neonatal seizures.

=== Treatment ===
Seizures respond to oxacarbazepine or carbamazepine and there has proven to be good long-term neurologic outcome. In a subset of cases, such as patients with KCKNQ2 mutations and SCN2A-associated seizures, there is a higher chance of patients needing to remain on medication.
