= Infant =

Very young human being

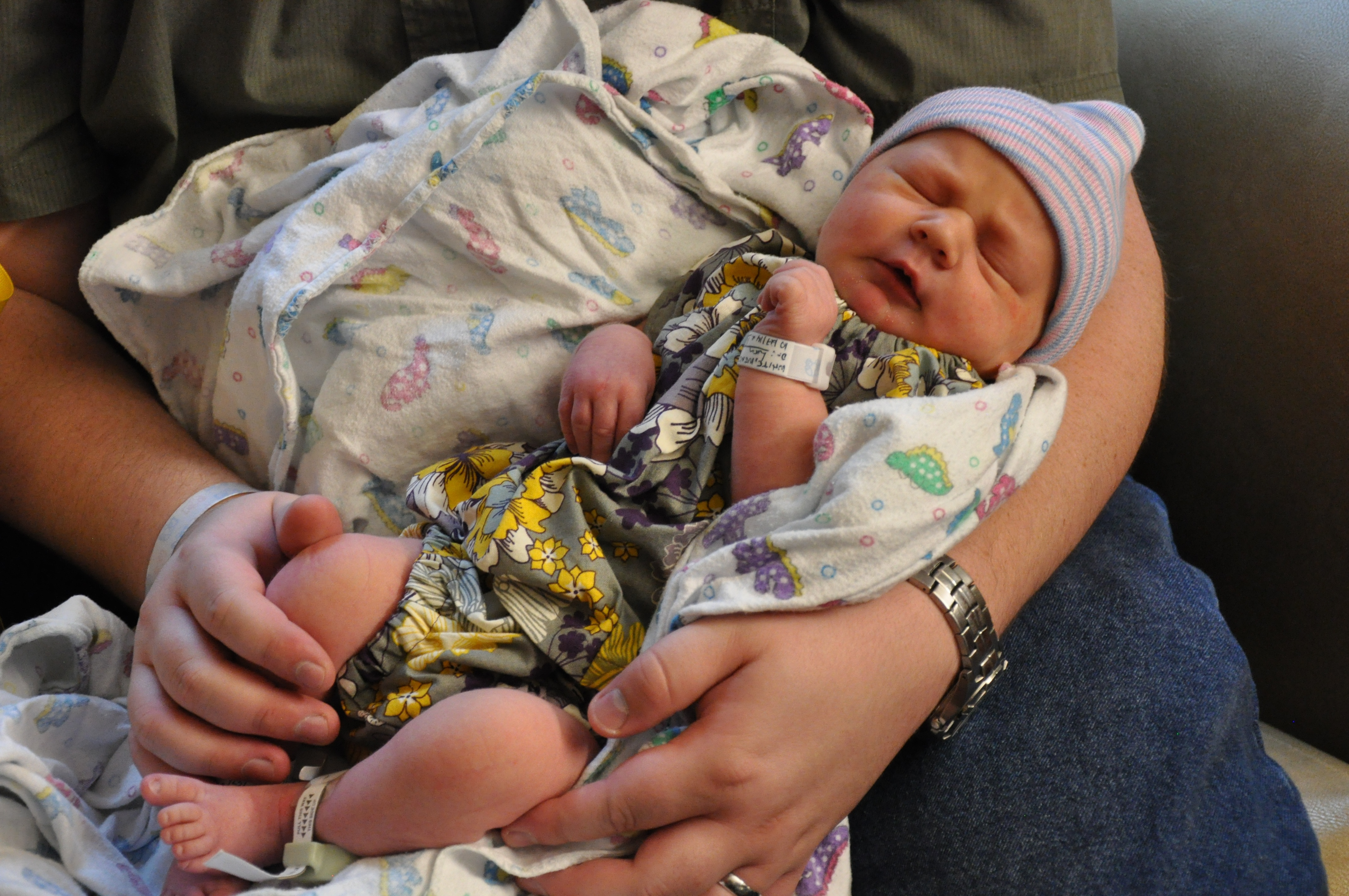
A newborn in a man's lap

An infant (from Latin īnfāns 'baby, child', literally 'unspeaking') is a very young human being. Baby is an alternative term for infant. The terms may also be used to refer to juvenile beings of other organisms. A newborn is, in mainstream use, an infant who is only hours, days, or weeks old; while in medical contexts, a newborn or neonate (from Latin neonātus 'newborn') is an infant in the first 28 days after birth (the term applies to premature, full term, and postmature infants).

Infants born prior to 37 weeks of gestation are called "premature", those born between 39 and 40 weeks are "full term", those born through 41 weeks are "late term", and anything beyond 42 weeks is considered "post term".

Before birth, the offspring is called a fetus. The term infant is typically applied to very young children under one year of age; however, definitions may vary and may include children up to two years of age. When a human child learns to walk, they are appropriately called a toddler instead.

== Other uses ==
In British English, an infant school is for children aged between four and seven.

As a legal term, infancy may mean "minority", and continues until a person reaches the age of majority.

== Physical characteristics ==
A newborn's shoulders and hips are wide, the abdomen protrudes slightly, and the arms and legs are relatively long with respect to the rest of their body.

=== Head ===
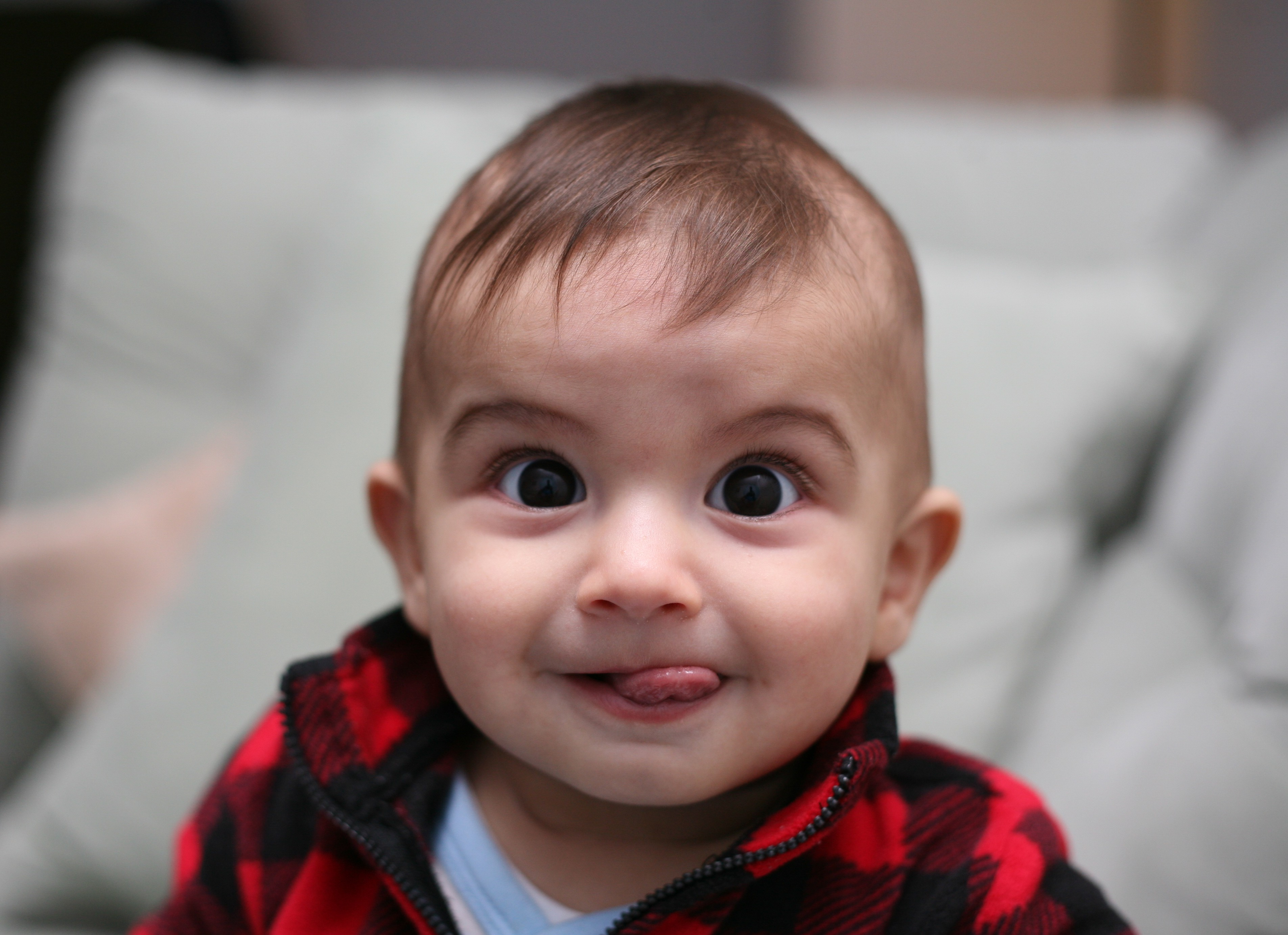
Eight-month-old infant; as a common feature, eyes are usually large in relation to the face.

A newborn's head is very large in proportion to the body, and the cranium is enormous relative to their face. While the adult human skull is about one seventh of the total body length, the newborn's is about 1/4. Normal head circumference for a full-term infant is 33–36 cm at birth. At birth, many regions of the newborn's skull have not yet been converted to bone, leaving "soft spots" known as fontanels. The two largest are the diamond-shaped anterior fontanel, located at the top front portion of the head, and the smaller triangular-shaped posterior fontanel, which lies at the back of the head. Later in the child's life, these bones will fuse together in a natural process. A protein called noggin is responsible for the delay in an infant's skull fusion.

During labour and birth, the infant's skull changes shape to fit through the birth canal, sometimes causing the child to be born with a misshapen or elongated head. It will usually return to normal on its own within a few days or weeks. Special exercises sometimes advised by physicians may assist the process.

=== Hair ===
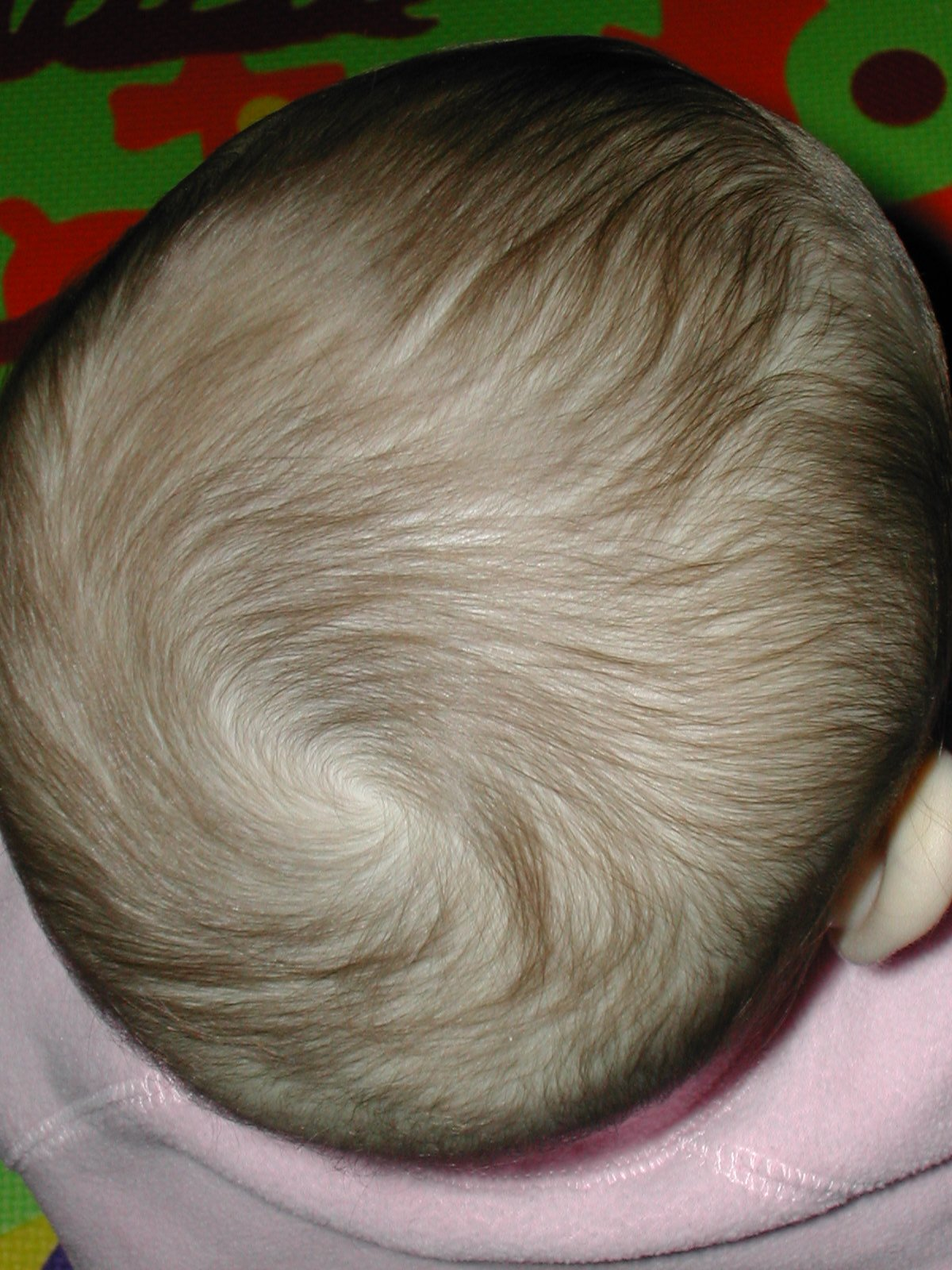
Thin brown hair of a one-year-old infant girl

Some newborns have a fine, downy body hair called lanugo. It may be particularly noticeable on the back, shoulders, forehead, ears and face of premature infants. Lanugo disappears within a few weeks. Infants may be born with full heads of hair; others, particularly Caucasian infants, may have very fine hair or may even be bald. Amongst fair-skinned parents, this fine hair may be blonde, even if the parents are not. An infant's hair color and texture can change: red can give way to blond, curly can go straight, and thick, dark hair could reappear a lot sparser and lighter. The scalp may also be temporarily bruised or swollen, especially in hairless newborns, and the area around the eyes may be puffy.

=== Length ===
In developed countries, the average total body length of a newborn is 35.6–50.8 cm (14.0–20.0 in), although premature newborns may be much smaller.

The way to measure a baby's length is to lay the baby down and stretch a measuring tape from the top of the head to the bottom of the heel.

=== Weight ===
In developed countries, the average birth weight of a full-term newborn is approximately 3.4 kg (7 1/2 lb), and is typically in the range of 2.7–4.6 kg (6.0–10.1 lb).

Over the first 5–7 days following birth, the body weight of a term neonate decreases by 3–7%, and is largely a result of the resorption and urination of the fluid that initially fills the lungs, in addition to a delay of often a few days before breastfeeding becomes effective. After the first week, healthy term neonates should gain 10–20 grams/kg/day.

=== Skin ===
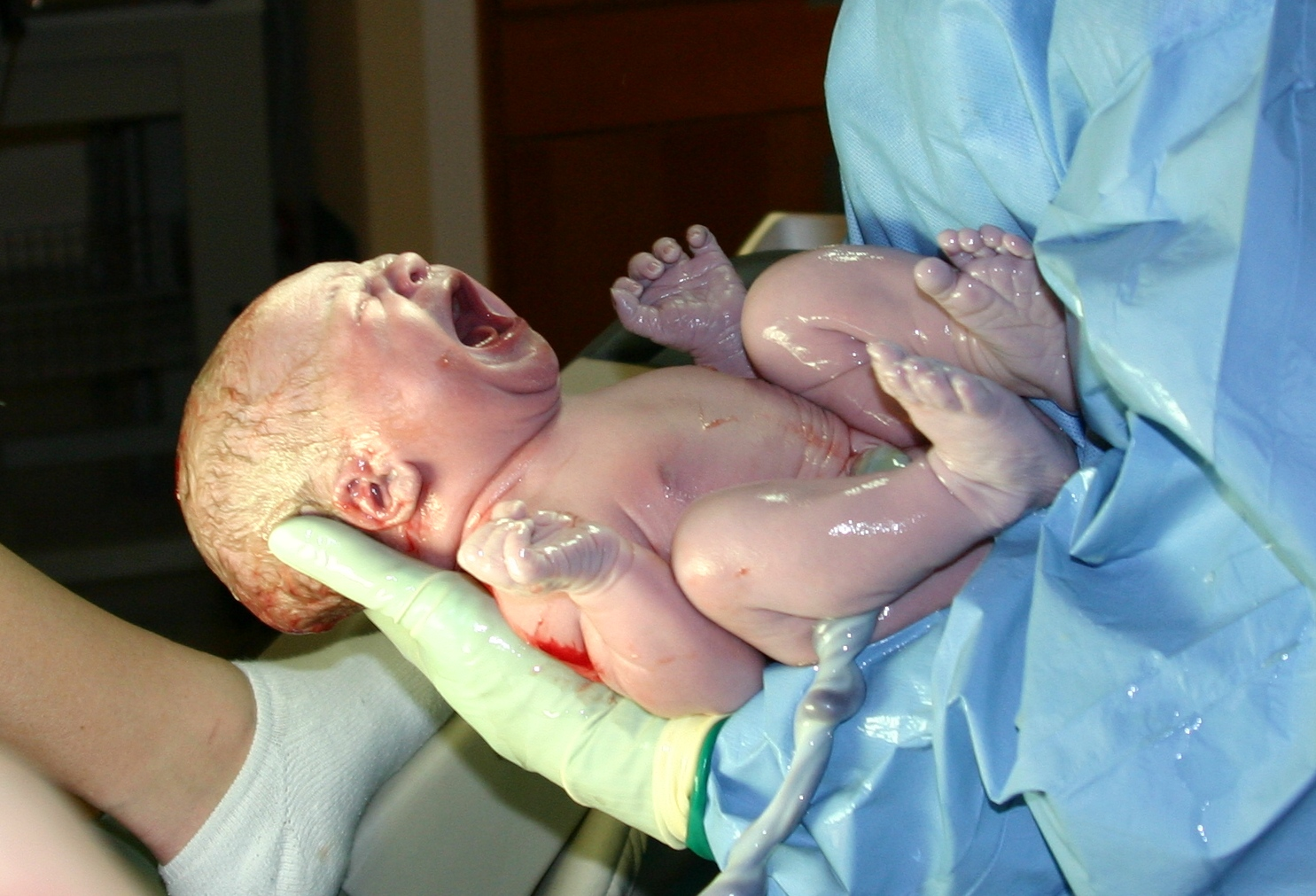
A newborn infant, seconds after delivery. Amniotic fluid glistens on her skin, and the umbilical cord is still attached.

Immediately after birth, a newborn's skin is often grayish to dusky blue in color. As soon as the newborn begins to breathe, usually within a minute or two, the skin's color reaches its normal tone. Newborns are wet, covered in streaks of blood, and coated with a white substance known as vernix caseosa, which is hypothesised to act as an antibacterial barrier. The newborn may also have Mongolian spots, various other birthmarks, or peeling skin, particularly on the wrists, hands, ankles, and feet.

=== Umbilical cord ===
The umbilical cord of a newborn is bluish-white in color. After birth, the umbilical cord is normally cut, leaving a 1–2 inch stub. The umbilical stub will dry out, shrivel, darken, and spontaneously fall off within about 3 weeks. This will later become the navel after it heals.

The umbilical cord contains three vessels: two arteries and one vein. The two arteries carry blood from the baby to the placenta while one vein carries blood back to the baby.

=== Genitals ===
A newborn's genitals are enlarged and reddened, with male infants having an unusually large scrotum. The breasts may also be enlarged, even in male infants. This is caused by naturally occurring maternal hormones and is a temporary condition. Females (and sometimes males) may actually discharge milk from their nipples (sometimes called witch's milk), or a bloody or milky-like substance from the vagina. In either case, this is considered normal and will disappear with time.

== Care and feeding ==
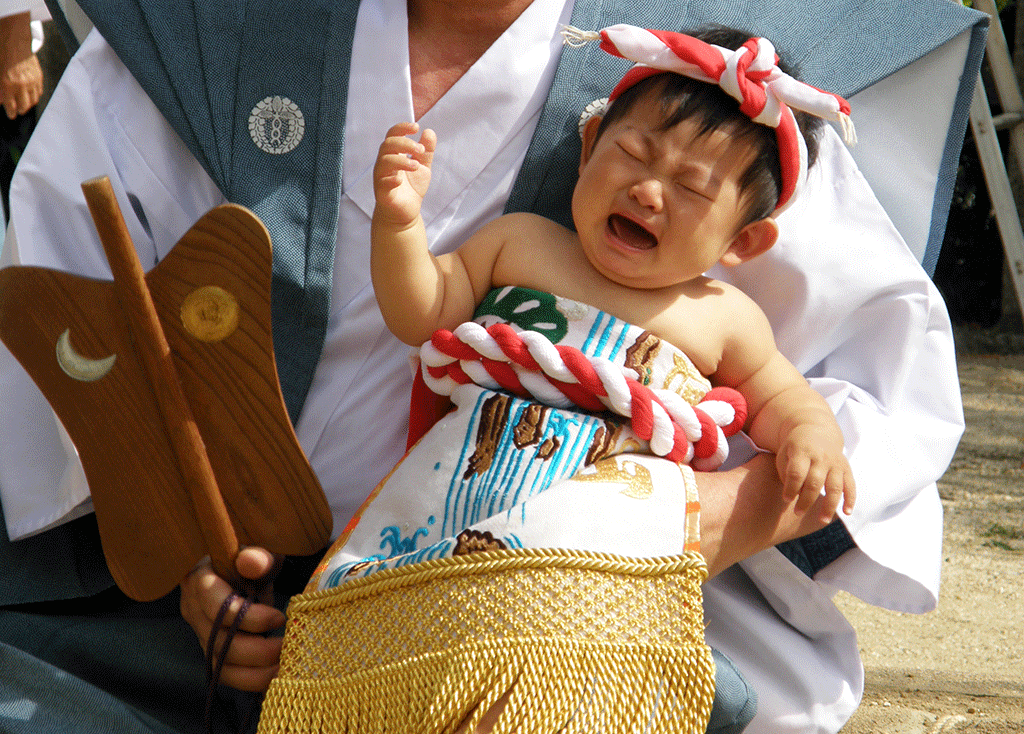
An infant crying

Infants cry as a form of basic instinctive communication. A crying infant may be trying to express a variety of feelings including hunger, discomfort, overstimulation, boredom, wanting something, or loneliness.

Infants are altricial and are fully dependent on their mothers or an adult caretaker for an extended period of time. Breastfeeding is the recommended method of feeding by all major infant health organizations. If breastfeeding is not possible or desired, bottle feeding is done with expressed breast-milk or with infant formula. Infants are born with a sucking reflex allowing them to extract the milk from the nipples of the breasts or the nipple of the baby bottle, as well as an instinctive behavior known as rooting with which they seek out the nipple. Sometimes a wet nurse is hired to feed the infant, although this is rare, especially in developed countries.

Adequate food consumption at an early age is vital for an infant's development. The foundations of optimum health, growth, and neurodevelopment across the lifespan are established in the first 1,000 days of life. From birth to six months, infants should consume only breast milk or an unmodified milk substitute. As an infant's diet matures, finger foods may be introduced as well as fruit, vegetables and small amounts of meat.

As infants grow, food supplements can be added. Many parents choose commercial, ready-made baby foods to supplement breast milk or formula for the child, while others adapt their usual meals for the dietary needs of their child. Whole cow's milk can be used at one year, but lower-fat milk is not recommended until the child is two to three years old. Weaning is the process through which breast milk is eliminated from the infant's diet through the introduction of solid foods in exchange for milk. Until they are toilet-trained, infants in industrialized countries wear diapers. The transition from diapers to training pants is an important transition in the development of an infant to that of a toddler. Children need more sleep than adults—up to 18 hours for newborn babies, with a declining rate as the child ages. Until babies learn to walk, they are carried in the arms, held in slings or baby carriers, or transported in baby carriages or strollers. Most industrialized countries have laws requiring child safety seats for babies in motor vehicles.

=== Common care issues ===
- Baby colic
- Bassinet/crib
- Cradle cap
- Day care
- Diaper rash
- Infant massage
- Immunization
- Pacifier
- Paternal bond
- Swaddling
- Teething

=== Benefits of touch ===
Experiments have been done with infants up to four months of age using both positive touch (stroking or cuddling) and negative touch (poking, pinching, or tickling). The infants who received the positive touch cried less often and vocalized and smiled more than the infants who were touched negatively. Infants who were the recipients of negative touch have also been linked with emotional and behavioral problems later in life. A lower amount of physical violence in adults has been discovered in cultures with greater levels of positive physical touching.

=== Language development ===
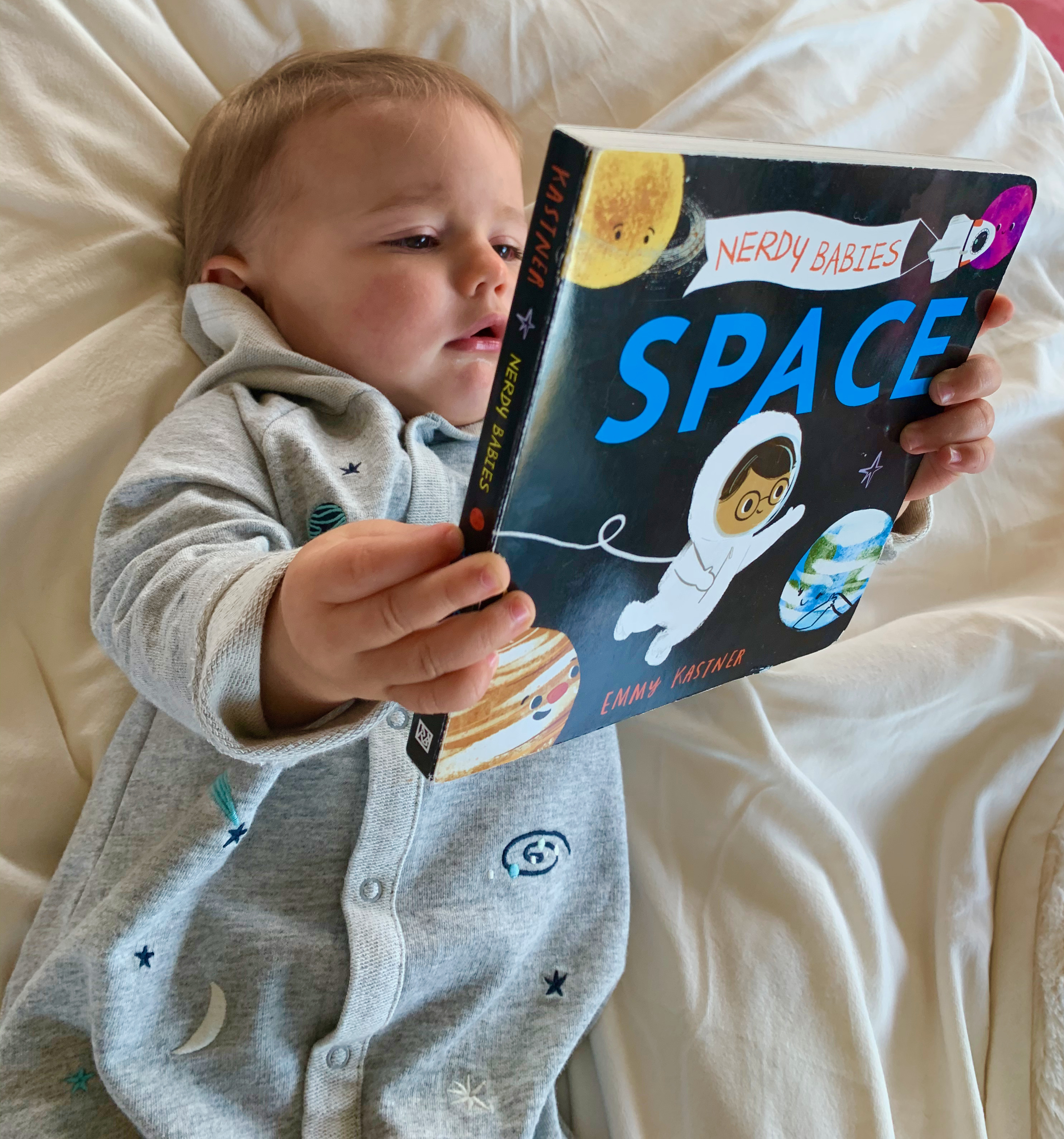
An infant holding a space-themed baby book

Caregivers of an infant are advised to pick up on the infant's facial expressions and mirror them. Reproducing and empathizing with their facial expressions enables infants to experience effectiveness and to recognize their own actions more easily (see mirror neurons). Exaggeratedly reproduced facial expressions and gestures are recommended, as they are clearer forms of expression. The baby's babbling should also be picked up and repeated. By imitating each other's sounds the first simple dialogues are initiated. Accentuated pronunciation and melodic intonation make it easier to recognize individual words in a sentence. However, it is not advisable to use simplified "baby talk" (e.g. "Did you 'ouch'?" instead of, "Did you hurt yourself?").

Even if parents cannot yet understand infants' babbling, a timely response by parents to babbling leads to faster language acquisition. This was confirmed by researchers who first studied mothers' behavior towards 8-month-old infants and later tested the infants' vocabulary when they were 15 months old. A first important development of infants is the discovery that they can influence their parents through babbling (development of intentional communication). Parents can encourage this by engaging with their infants in babbling. This in turn promotes further language development, as infants then turn to their parents more often.

Previous studies have shown that the infant's speech is encouraged when parents, for example, smile in the infant's direction or touch the infant every time the infant looks at them and babbles. It also helps if parents respond to what they think their baby is saying (for example, giving a ball or commenting when the baby looks at the ball and babbles). Responding to sounds produced when the baby looks at an object (object-directed vocalizations) thus provide an opportunity to learn the name of the object. In this way, babies also learn that sounds are associated with objects. However, language development is only achieved if parents react positively (e.g. smile) in response to the infant's babbling. A high response rate without a connection to the infant's utterances does not lead to language promotion. It is detrimental to language development if a mother instead tries to divert the infant's attention to something else.

=== Sleep ===
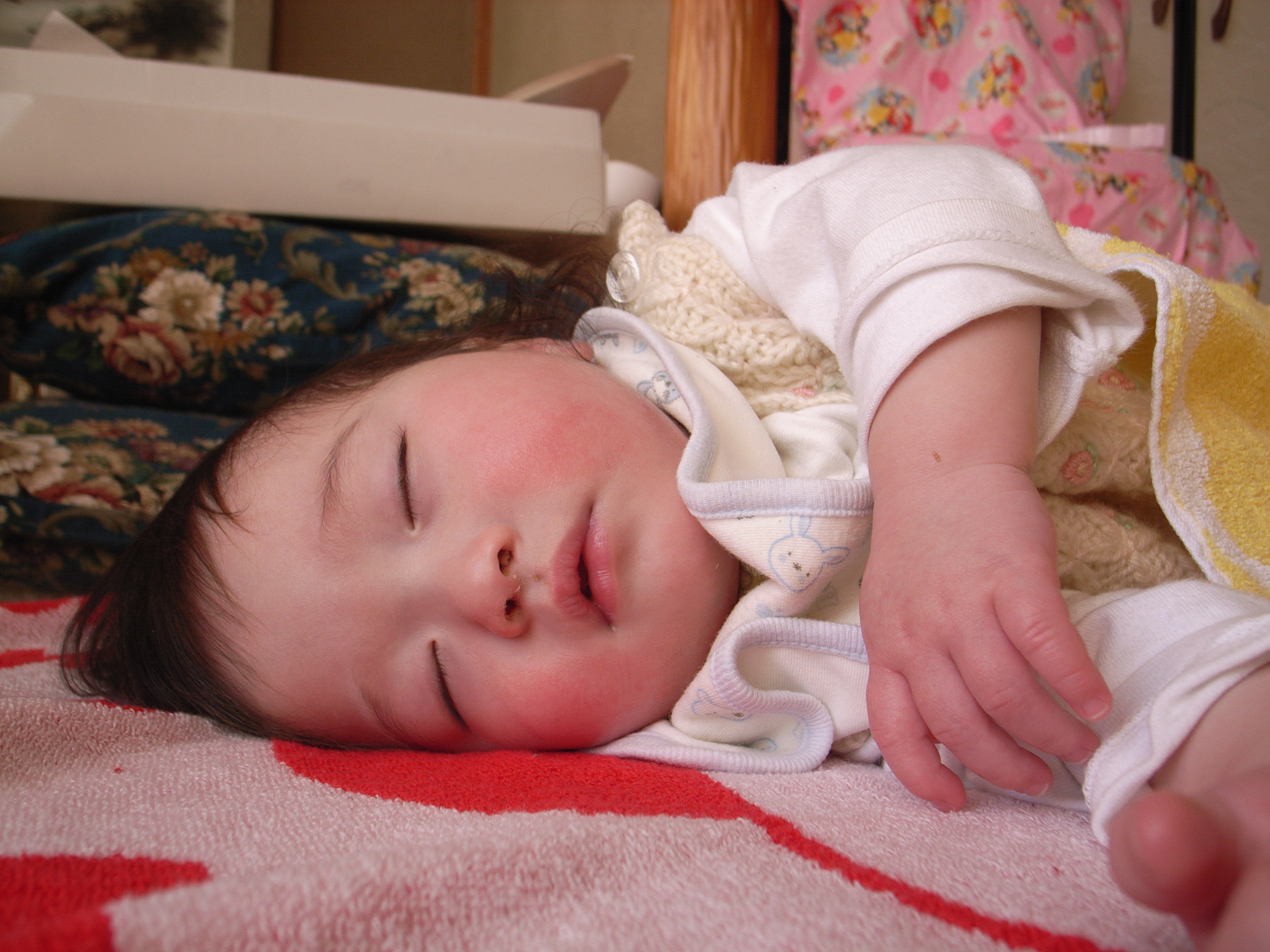
A sleeping infant

A 2018 review analysed 146 studies on infant sleep behavior and listed several factors that show an effect on sleep duration and the number of night awakenings. However, research has indicated that frequent wakings are protective of SIDS.

Infant sleep is not linear, ebbing and flowing with developmental milestones and age.

The National Sleep Foundation gives a rough recommendation on sleep hours, that commonly decreases with increasing age.

=== Maternal sensitivity ===
Maternal sensitivity plays a particular role in the relationship with the infant and for favorable emotional development. This means being attentive to the infant's behavioral expressions, not misinterpreting the infant's expressions because of one's own moods, reacting immediately to the situation and finding a response that is appropriate to the context and the expressed needs. A secure attachment is promoted through empathetic and adequate as well as prompt responses. In accordance with their basic needs, infants show an inborn behavior of seeking closeness to the mother – or to another primary caregiver – and thus in turn foster an attachment. When separated from the mother, infants protest by crying and by body movements.

=== Other ===
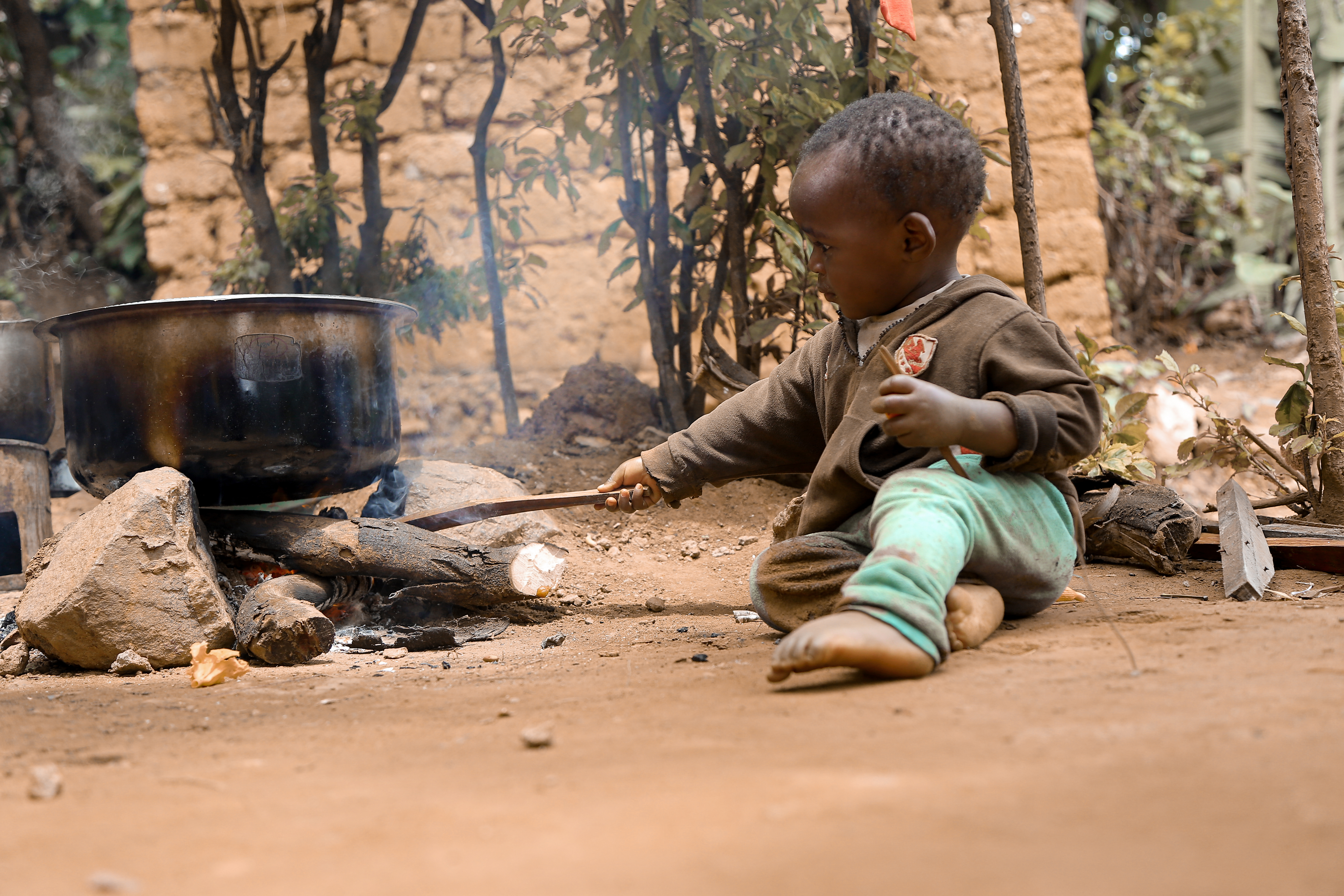
An infant from Uganda playing with stoves

Wearing has a calming effect on infants. A 2013 study showed that infants placed in a cradle cried and kicked more often and had an increased heart rate (so the infants were stressed), while those picked up and carried by the mother while walking around calmed down significantly. The effect of being held motionless in the arm was intermediate between that of being carried around and that of being put down. That carrying (e.g., in a baby sling) makes infants more content and makes them cry less had already been shown in a randomized study in 1986.

For infant feeding, breastfeeding is recommended by all major infant health organizations.

Many airlines refuse boarding for all babies aged under 7 days (for domestic flights) or 14 days for international flights. Asiana Airlines allows babies to board international flights at 7 days of age. Garuda Indonesia disallows all babies under the age of 14 days to board any flights.

Delta Air Lines allows infants to travel when they are less than 7 days old when they present a physician travel approval letter. Skywest will not allow an infant less than 8 days old on board.

== Behaviour ==
=== Emotional development ===
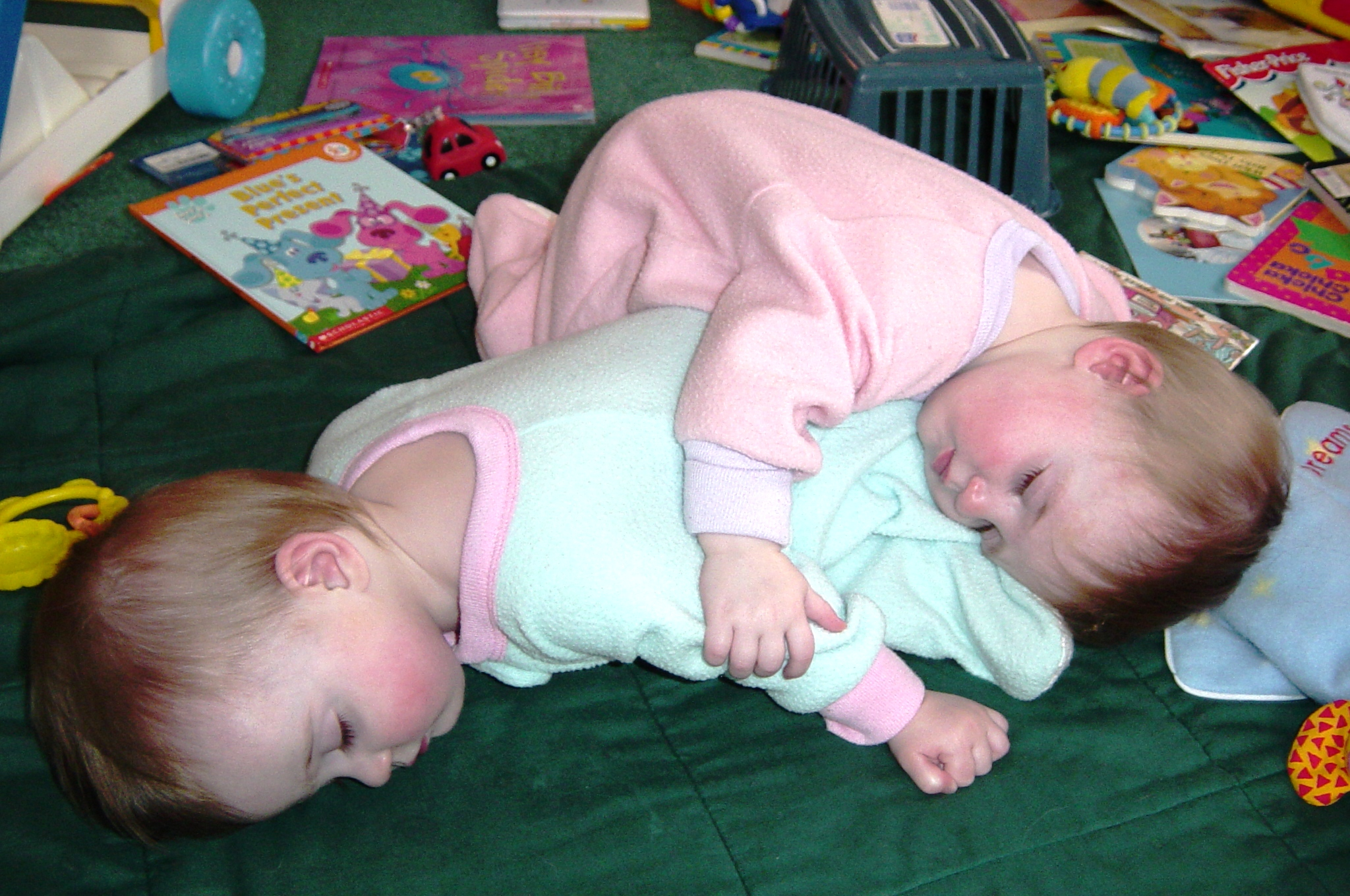
Eight-month-old twin sisters

Attachment theory is primarily an evolutionary and ethological theory whereby the infant or child seeks proximity to a specified attachment figure in situations of alarm or distress for the purpose of survival. The forming of attachments is considered to be the foundation of the infant/child's capacity to form and conduct relationships throughout life. Attachment is not the same as love or affection although they often go together. Attachment and attachment behaviors tend to develop between the age of six months and 3 years. Infants become attached to adults who are sensitive and responsive in social interactions with the infant, and who remain as consistent caregivers for some time. Parental responses lead to the development of patterns of attachment, which in turn lead to 'internal working models' which will guide the individual's feelings, thoughts, and expectations in later relationships. There are a number of attachment 'styles' namely 'secure', 'anxious-ambivalent', 'anxious-avoidant', (all 'organized') and 'disorganized', some of which are more problematic than others. A lack of attachment or a seriously disrupted capacity for attachment could potentially amount to serious disorders.

Infants develop distinct relationships to their mothers, fathers, siblings, and non-familial caregivers. Beside the dyadic attachment relationships also a good quality of the triadic relationships (mother – father – infant) is important for infant mental health development.

=== Response to sounds ===
Infants respond to the sound of snake hissing, angry voices of adults, the crackling sound of a fire, thunder, and the cries of other infants. They have a drop in heart rate, their eyes blinking, increased turning toward the speakers or parent, all of these indicating that they were paying more attention. This is believed to be an evolutionary response to danger. Babies' ability to accurately locate sounds is refined during their first year.

== Health issues ==
=== Diseases ===
The infant is undergoing many adaptations to extrauterine life, and its physiological systems, such as the immune system, are far from fully developed. Potential diseases of concern during the neonatal period include:

- Neonatal jaundice
- Infant respiratory distress syndrome
- Neonatal lupus erythematosus
- Neonatal conjunctivitis
- Neonatal tetanus
- Neonatal sepsis
- Neonatal bowel obstruction
- Benign neonatal seizures
- Neonatal diabetes mellitus
- Neonatal alloimmune thrombocytopenia
- Neonatal herpes simplex
- Neonatal hemochromatosis
- Neonatal meningitis
- Neonatal hepatitis
- Neonatal hypoglycemia

=== Mortality ===
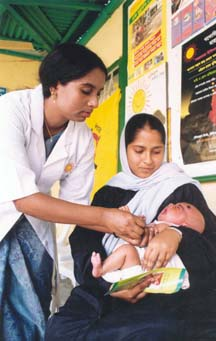
An infant being immunized in Bangladesh

Infant mortality is the death of an infant in the first year of life, often expressed as the number of deaths per 1,000 live births (infant mortality rate). Major causes of infant mortality include dehydration, infection, congenital malformation and SIDS.

This epidemiological indicator is recognized as a very important measure of the level of health care in a country because it is directly linked with the health status of infants, children, and pregnant women as well as access to medical care, socioeconomic conditions, and public health practices.

There is a positive relationship between national wealth and good health. The rich and industrialized countries of the world, prominently Canada, the United Kingdom, the United States, and Japan, spend a large proportion of their wealthy budget on the health care system. As, a result, their health care systems are very sophisticated, with many physicians, nurses, and other health care experts servicing the population. Thus, infant mortality is low. On the other hand, a country such as Mexico, which spends disproportionately less of its budget on healthcare, suffers from high mortality rates. This is because the general population is likely to be less healthy. In the U.S., infant mortality rates are especially high in minority groups. For instance, non-Hispanic black women have an infant mortality rate of 13.63 per 1,000 live births whereas in non-Hispanic white women it was much lower at a rate of 5.76 per 1,000 live births. The average infant mortality rate in the U.S. is 6.8 per 1,000 live births.

== Babyhood ==
Babyhood is a critical period in personality development when the foundations of adult personality are laid. In contrast, toddler is used to denote a baby that has achieved relative independence, in moving about, and feeding.

== See also ==
- Adult interaction with infants

== Bibliography ==
- Alison Mackonochie, Babycare week by week, the first six months, Harpercollins Publishers, 2007, 176 pages. ISBN 978-0-00-724020-3
- Paulien Bom and Machteld Huber, Baby's first year : growth and development from 0 to 12 months, Floris Books, Edinburgh, 2008, 125 pages. ISBN 978-086315-633-15. Originally published in Dutch under the title Groeiwijzer van nul tot één jaar by Christofoor Publishers, Zeist, in 1994.
- Harold S. Raucher (editor), Your babycare bible, Hamlyn, London, 2015, 392 pages, ISBN 978-0-600-63161-3

Preceded by Fetus	Stages of human development Infancy	Succeeded by Toddlerhood
