= Round and Round the Garden =

Nursery rhyme, often with actions

"Round and round the garden"

Nursery rhyme
- Written: Traditional
- Published: 1940s

"Round and round the garden" is an English language nursery rhyme typically accompanied by fingerplay. It has a Roud Folk Song Index number of 19235.

== Rhyme ==
The version given by The Oxford Dictionary of Nursery Rhymes is:

Round and round the garden
Like a teddy bear;
One step, two step,
Tickle you under there!

== Origins ==
The rhyme was first collected in Britain in the late 1940s. Since teddy bears did not come into vogue until the twentieth century it is likely to be fairly recent in its current form, but Iona and Peter Opie suggest that it is probably a version of an older rhyme, "Round about there":

Round about there
Sat a little hare,
The bow-wows came and chased him
Right up there!

== Accompanying actions ==
The adult reciting the verse starts by tracing an index finger in circles on the child's upturned palm, then walks their fingers up the arm with each "step", ending with a tickle under the child's arm.
