= List of artificial intelligence projects =

The following is a list of current and past, non-classified notable artificial intelligence projects.

== Specialized projects ==
=== Brain-inspired ===
- Blue Brain Project, an attempt to create a synthetic brain by reverse-engineering the mammalian brain down to the molecular level.
- Google Brain, a deep learning project part of Google X attempting to have intelligence similar or equal to human-level.
- Human Brain Project, ten-year scientific research project, based on exascale supercomputers.

=== Cognitive architectures ===
- 4CAPS, developed at Carnegie Mellon University under Marcel A. Just
- ACT-R, developed at Carnegie Mellon University under John R. Anderson.
- AIXI, Universal Artificial Intelligence developed by Marcus Hutter at IDSIA and ANU.
- CALO, a DARPA-funded, 25-institution effort to integrate many artificial intelligence approaches (natural language processing, speech recognition, machine vision, probabilistic logic, planning, reasoning, many forms of machine learning) into an AI assistant that learns to help manage your office environment.
- CHREST, developed under Fernand Gobet at Brunel University and Peter C. Lane at the University of Hertfordshire.
- CLARION, developed under Ron Sun at Rensselaer Polytechnic Institute and University of Missouri.
- CoJACK, an ACT-R inspired extension to the JACK multi-agent system that adds a cognitive architecture to the agents for eliciting more realistic (human-like) behaviors in virtual environments.
- Copycat, by Douglas Hofstadter and Melanie Mitchell at the Indiana University.
- DUAL, developed at the New Bulgarian University under Boicho Kokinov.
- FORR developed by Susan L. Epstein at The City University of New York.
- IDA and LIDA, implementing Global Workspace Theory, developed under Stan Franklin at the University of Memphis.
- OpenCog Prime, developed using the OpenCog Framework.
- Procedural Reasoning System (PRS), developed by Michael Georgeff and Amy L. Lansky at SRI International.
- Psi-Theory developed under Dietrich Dörner at the Otto-Friedrich University in Bamberg, Germany.
- Soar, developed under Allen Newell and John Laird at Carnegie Mellon University and the University of Michigan.
- Society of Mind and its successor The Emotion Machine proposed by Marvin Minsky.
- Subsumption architectures, developed e.g. by Rodney Brooks (though it could be argued whether they are cognitive).

=== Games ===
- AlphaGo, software developed by Google that plays the Chinese board game Go.
- Chinook, a computer program that plays English draughts; the first to win the world champion title in the competition against humans.
- Deep Blue, a chess-playing computer developed by IBM which beat Garry Kasparov in 1997.
- Halite, an artificial intelligence programming competition created by Two Sigma in 2016.
- Libratus, a poker AI that beat world-class poker players in 2017, intended to be generalisable to other applications.
- The Matchbox Educable Noughts and Crosses Engine (sometimes called the Machine Educable Noughts and Crosses Engine or MENACE) was a mechanical computer made from 304 matchboxes designed and built by artificial intelligence researcher Donald Michie in 1961.
- Quick, Draw!, an online game developed by Google that challenges players to draw a picture of an object or idea and then uses a neural network to guess what the drawing is.
- The Samuel Checkers-playing Program (1959) was among the world's first successful self-learning programs, and as such a very early demonstration of the fundamental concept of artificial intelligence (AI).
- Stockfish AI, an open source chess engine currently ranked the highest in many computer chess rankings.
- TD-Gammon, a program that learned to play world-class backgammon partly by playing against itself (temporal difference learning with neural networks).

=== Internet activism ===
- Serenata de Amor, project for the analysis of public expenditures and detect discrepancies.

=== Knowledge and reasoning ===
- Alice (Microsoft), a project from Microsoft Research Lab aimed at improving decision-making in Economics
- Braina, an intelligent personal assistant application with a voice interface for Windows OS.
- Cyc, an attempt to assemble an ontology and database of everyday knowledge, enabling human-like reasoning.
- Eurisko, a language by Douglas Lenat for solving problems which consists of heuristics, including some for how to use and change its heuristics.
- Google Now, an intelligent personal assistant with a voice interface in Google's Android and Apple Inc.'s iOS, as well as Google Chrome web browser on personal computers.
- Holmes a new AI created by Wipro.
- Microsoft Cortana, an intelligent personal assistant with a voice interface in Microsoft's various Windows 10 editions.
- MindsDB, is an AI automation platform for building AI/ML powered features and applications.
- Mycin, an early medical expert system.
- Open Mind Common Sense, a project based at the MIT Media Lab to build a large common sense knowledge base from online contributions.
- Siri, an intelligent personal assistant and knowledge navigator with a voice-interface in Apple Inc.'s iOS and macOS.
- SNePS, simultaneously a logic-based, frame-based, and network-based knowledge representation, reasoning, and acting system.
- Viv (software), a new AI by the creators of Siri.
- Wolfram Alpha, an online service that answers queries by computing the answer from structured data.

=== Motion and manipulation ===
- AIBO, the robot pet for the home, grew out of Sony's Computer Science Laboratory (CSL).
- Cog, a robot developed by MIT to study theories of cognitive science and artificial intelligence, now discontinued.

=== Music ===
- Melomics, a bioinspired technology for music composition and synthesization of music, where computers develop their own style, rather than mimic musicians.

=== Natural language processing ===
- AIML, an XML dialect for creating natural language software agents.
- Apache Lucene, a high-performance, full-featured text search engine library written entirely in Java.
- Apache OpenNLP, a machine learning based toolkit for the processing of natural language text. It supports the most common NLP tasks, such as tokenization, sentence segmentation, part-of-speech tagging, named entity extraction, chunking and parsing.
- Artificial Linguistic Internet Computer Entity (A.L.I.C.E.), a natural language processing chatterbot.
- ChatGPT, a chatbot built on top of OpenAI's GPT-3.5 and GPT-4 family of large language models.
- Claude, a family of large language models developed by Anthropic and launched in 2023. Claude LLMs achieved high coding scores in several recognized LLM benchmarks.
- Cleverbot, successor to Jabberwacky, now with 170m lines of conversation, Deep Context, fuzziness and parallel processing. Cleverbot learns from around 2 million user interactions per month.
- DeepSeek: Chinese chatbot funded by hedge fund High-Flyer.
- DBRX, 136 billion parameter open sourced large language model developed by Mosaic ML and Databricks.
- ELIZA, a famous 1966 computer program by Joseph Weizenbaum, which parodied person-centered therapy.
- FreeHAL, a self-learning conversation simulator (chatterbot) which uses semantic nets to organize its knowledge to imitate a very close human behavior within conversations.
- Gemini, a family of multimodal large language model developed by Google's DeepMind. Drives the chatbot of the same name, formerly known as Bard.
- GigaChat, a chatbot by Russian Sberbank.
- GPT-3, a 2020 language model developed by OpenAI that can produce text difficult to distinguish from that written by a human.
- Jabberwacky, a chatbot by Rollo Carpenter, aiming to simulate natural human chat.
- LaMDA, a family of conversational neural language models developed by Google.
- LLaMA, a 2023 language model family developed by Meta that includes 7, 13, 33 and 65 billion parameter models.
- Mycroft, a free and open-source intelligent personal assistant that uses a natural language user interface.
- PARRY, another early chatterbot, written in 1972 by Kenneth Colby, attempting to simulate a paranoid schizophrenic.
- SHRDLU, an early natural language processing computer program developed by Terry Winograd at MIT from 1968 to 1970.
- SYSTRAN, a machine translation technology by the company of the same name, used by Yahoo!, AltaVista and Google, among others.

=== Speech recognition ===
- CMU Sphinx, a group of speech recognition systems developed at Carnegie Mellon University.
- DeepSpeech, an open-source Speech-To-Text engine based on Baidu's deep speech research paper.
- Whisper, an open-source speech recognition system developed at OpenAI.

=== Speech synthesis ===
- 15.ai, a real-time artificial intelligence text-to-speech tool developed by an anonymous researcher from MIT.
- Amazon Polly, a speech synthesis software by Amazon.
- Festival Speech Synthesis System, a general multi-lingual speech synthesis system developed at the Centre for Speech Technology Research (CSTR) at the University of Edinburgh.
- WaveNet, a deep neural network for generating raw audio.

=== Video ===
- CapCut is a video editor tool, developed by ByteDance for short video content on TikTok, YouTube, Instagram, and other social media platforms.
- HeyGen is a video creation platform that generates digital avatars that recite and translate text inputs into varying languages.
- Synthesia is a video creation and editing platform, with AI-generated avatars that resemble real human beings.
- VEO is a text to video model developed by Google DeepMind, VEO 3, the model released in May 2025 can also generate the video's audio
- Sora is also a text to video model made by OpenAI, the model generated short video clips based on prompts given by the user. Discontinued on september 30th 2026 due to the project not being profitable.

=== Other ===
- 1 the Road, the first novel marketed by an AI.
- AlphaFold is a deep learning based system developed by DeepMind for prediction of protein structure.
- Cluely is an AI assistant for virtual interviews.
- iLands, platform for running user-defined AI agents with goals of earning money.
- Otter.ai is a speech-to-text synthesis and summary platform, which allows users to record online meetings as text. It additionally creates live captions during meetings.
- Synthetic Environment for Analysis and Simulations (SEAS), a model of the real world used by Homeland security and the United States Department of Defense that uses simulation and AI to predict and evaluate future events and courses of action.

=== Code generation ===
- Amazon Q Developer — AI coding assistant by Amazon Web Services.
- Claude Code — AI coding tool by Anthropic.
- Codex — AI coding agent by OpenAI.
- Cursor — AI-assisted code editor by Anysphere.
- Devin AI — AI software development agent by Cognition AI.
- GitHub Copilot — AI coding assistant by GitHub.
- Google Antigravity — AI coding environment by Google.
- Replit Agent — AI app-building agent by Replit.
- Tabnine — AI code completion tool.

== Multipurpose projects ==
=== Software libraries ===
- Apache Mahout, a library of scalable machine learning algorithms.
- Deeplearning4j, an open-source, distributed deep learning framework written for the JVM.
- Keras, a high level open-source software library for machine learning (works on top of other libraries).
- Microsoft Cognitive Toolkit (previously known as CNTK), an open source toolkit for building artificial neural networks.
- OpenNN, a comprehensive C++ library implementing neural networks.
- PyTorch, an open-source Tensor and Dynamic neural network in Python.
- TensorFlow, an open-source software library for machine learning.
- Theano, a Python library and optimizing compiler for manipulating and evaluating mathematical expressions, especially matrix-valued ones.

=== GUI frameworks ===
- Neural Designer, a commercial deep learning tool for predictive analytics.
- Neuroph, a Java neural network framework.
- OpenCog, a GPL-licensed framework for artificial intelligence written in C++, Python and Scheme.
- PolyAnalyst: A commercial tool for data mining, text mining, and knowledge management.
- RapidMiner, an environment for machine learning and data mining, now developed commercially.
- Weka, a free implementation of many machine learning algorithms in Java.

=== Cloud services ===
- Data Applied, a web based data mining environment.
- Watson, a pilot service by IBM to uncover and share data-driven insights, and to spur cognitive applications.

== See also ==
- Comparison of cognitive architectures
- Comparison of deep-learning software
- Comparison of machine learning software
- List of artificial intelligence journals
- List of artificial intelligence algorithms
- Lists of open-source artificial intelligence software
