= Comparison of cognitive architectures =

The following table compares cognitive architectures.

Comparison of cognitive architectures
Names	Underlying theory (symbolic, connectionist, or hybrid)	Achievements	Estimated requirements	Non-laboratory usages	Activity status (active or dead + RSS news)	Year of creation	Related publications	License (if applies, for example GPL)
4CAPS	hybrid	?	?	?	?	?	?	
ACT-R	hybrid	?	?	?	Active	?	Anderson, 2007	
ASMO	hybrid	Many robotic systems	?	IBM internet-of-things system	Active	2009	Novianto, Johnston and Williams 2010	
CHREST	symbolic	?	?	?	Active	1992	?	
CLARION	hybrid	Many psychological theories derived from it	?	?	Active	1994	Sun, 2002, 2016	
Copycat	?	?	?	?	?	?	?	
Deeplearning4j	hybrid	online learning, anomaly detection, image recognition	?	?	Active		Josh Patterson & Adam Gibson (2017)	Apache 2.0
DUAL	hybrid	?	?	?	?	?	?	
EPAM	?	?	?	?	?	1959	?	
EPIC	?	?	?	?	?	?	?	
GLAIR	symbolic	?	?	?	Active	?	Bona and Shapiro, 2009	?
Hierarchical Temporal Memory	connectionist	online learning, anomaly detection	?	anomaly detection	Active	2009	Hawkins et al (multiple)	AGPL
LIDA	symbolic	?	?	?	?	?	?	
MAMID	?	?	?	?	?	?	Hudlicka, 2002; 2003	?
Mibe architecture	?	?	?	?	?	1998	?	
OpenCog	hybrid	chatbot, game avatar	?	misc subsystems in commercial, financial, medical	Active	2001	Goertzel et al (multiple)	AGPL
Parallel terraced scan	?	?	?	?	?	?	?	
Procedural Reasoning System	?	?	?	?	?	?	?	
R-CAST	?	?	?	?	?	?	?	
Soar	symbolic	?	?	Yes	Active	1983	Laird (2012)	BSD 2 clause
Sigma	Hybrid	Ray Kurzweil Awards at AGI 2011 and 2012	?	Not yet	Active	2009	Rosenbloom, Demski, Ustun (2016)	BSD 2 clause
SOSIEL	Symbolic		.Net Core	policy analysis	Active	2018	Sotnik (2018)	Open source
TinyCog	symbolic	?	?	?	Active	2015	Bergmann and Fenton, 2015	GNU GPL V3

== See also ==
- List of artificial intelligence projects
- Lists of open-source artificial intelligence software
- Comparison of deep-learning software
