= Loua =

Loua is a surname. Notable people with the surname include:

- Alexandre Cécé Loua (born 1956), Guinean diplomat
- Joseph Loua (born 1976), Guinean sprinter
- Marius Loua (born 1982), Ivorian sprinter
- Robert Loua, Guinean sprinter
- Toussaint Loua (1824–1907), French statistician
- Adriel Ba Loua (born 1996), Ivorian footballer
