= Fluid Concepts and Creative Analogies =

1995 book by Douglas Hofstadter

- Cover to the first edition
- Author: Douglas Hofstadter
- Published: 1995 (Harvester Wheatsheaf)
- Pages: 250
- ISBN: 978-0-7450-1065-6
- OCLC: 24742774

Fluid Concepts and Creative Analogies: Computer Models of the Fundamental Mechanisms of Thought is a 1995 book by Douglas Hofstadter and other members of the Fluid Analogies Research Group exploring the mechanisms of intelligence through computer modeling. It contends that the notions of analogy and fluidity are fundamental to explain how the human mind solves problems and to create computer programs that show intelligent behavior. It analyzes several computer programs that members of the group have created over the years to solve problems that require intelligence.

It was the first book ever sold by Amazon.com.

== Origin of the book ==
The book is a collection of revised articles that appeared in precedence, each preceded by an introduction by Hofstadter. They describe the scientific work by him and his collaborators in the 1980s and 1990s. The project started in the late 1970s at Indiana University. In 1983 he took a sabbatical year at MIT, working in Marvin Minsky's Artificial Intelligence Lab. There he met and collaborated with Melanie Mitchell, who then became his doctoral student. Subsequently, Hofstadter moved to the University of Michigan, where the FARG (Fluid Analogies Research Group) was founded. Eventually he returned to Indiana University in 1988, continuing the FARG research there. The book was written during a sabbatical year at the Istituto per la Ricerca Scientifica e Tecnologica in Trento, Italy..

== Publication ==
Upon publication, Jon Udell, a Byte senior technical editor-at-large said:

Fifteen years ago, Gödel, Escher, Bach: An Eternal Golden Braid exploded on the literary scene, earning its author a Pulitzer prize and a monthly column in Scientific American. Douglas Hofstadter's exuberant synthesis of math, music, and art, and his inspired thought experiments with "tangled hierarchy," recursion, pattern recognition, figure/ground reversal, and self-reference, delighted armchair philosophers and AI theorists. But in the end, many people believed that these intellectual games yielded no useful model of cognition on which to base future AI research. Now Fluid Concepts and Creative Analogies presents that model, along with the computer programs Hofstadter and his associates have designed to test it. These programs work in stripped-down yet surprisingly rich microdomains.

On April 3, 1995, Fluid Concepts and Creative Analogies became the first book ordered online by an Amazon.com customer.

== Chapters and authors ==
- To Seek Whence Cometh a Sequence (D.H.)
- The Architecture of Jumbo (D.H.)
- Numbo: A Study in Cognition and Recognition (Daniel Defays)
- High-level Perception, Representation, and Analogy: A Critique of Artificial-intelligence Methodology (David Chalmers, Robert French, and D.H.)
- The Copycat Project: A Model of Mental Fluidity and Analogy-making (D.H. and Melanie Mitchell)
- Perspectives on Copycat: Comparisons with Recent Work (Melanie Mitchell and D.H.)
- Prolegomena to Any Future Metacat (D.H.)
- Tabletop, BattleOp, Ob-Platte, Potelbat, Belpatto, Platobet (D.H. and Robert French)
- The Emergent Personality of Tabletop, a Perception-based Model of Analogy-making (D.H. and Robert French)
- Letter Spirit: Esthetic Perception and Creative Play in the Rich Microcosm of the Roman Alphabet (D.H. and Gary McGraw)

== Summary of chapters ==
=== Chapter 1: To Seek Whence Cometh a Sequence ===
The first AI project by Hofstadter stemmed from his teenage fascination with number sequences. When he was 17, he studied the way that triangular and square numbers interleave, and eventually found a recursive relation describing it. In his first course on AI, he set to the students and to himself the task of writing a program that could extrapolate the rule by which a numeric sequence is generated. He discusses breadth-first and depth-first techniques, but eventually concludes that the results represent expert systems that incarnate a lot of technical knowledge but don't shine much light on the mental processes that humans use to solve such puzzles.

Instead he devised a simplified version of the problem, called SeekWhence, where sequences are based on very simple basic rules not requiring advanced mathematical knowledge. He argues that pattern recognition, analogy, and fluid working hypotheses are fundamental to understand how humans tackle such problems.

=== Chapter 2: The Architecture of Jumbo ===
Jumbo is a program to solve jumbles, word puzzles consisting in five or six scrambled letters that need to be anagrammed to form an English word. The resulting word does not need to be a real one but just to a plausible, that is, to consists of a sequence of letters that is normal in English.

The constituent elements of Jumbo are the following:

- The "chunkabet": a database of chunks, small sequences of letters, with a numeric value giving their strength as possible components of a word.
- The "cytoplasm": a loose data structure containing partial associations of letter, modeling a form of working memory. The name is inspired by the place in a cell where molecular fragments are assembled into proteins.
- The "Coderack": a structure containing "codelets", small pieces of programs that are waiting to be executed in the cytoplasm; the codelet that is executed next is chosen non-deterministically, based on urgencies attached to them; a codelet may form new associations, break down old ones, or generate more codelets.

A "temperature" is associated to the present state of the cytoplasm; it determines how probable it is that a destructive codelet is executed. There is a "freezing" temperature at which no destruction can occur anymore: a solution has been found.

=== Chapter 3: Numbo: A Study in Cognition and Recognition ===
Numbo is a program by Daniel Defays that tries to solve numerical problems similar to those used in the French game "Le compte est bon". The game consists in combining some numbers called "bricks", using the operations of multiplication, addition, and subtraction, to obtain a given result.

The program is modeled on Jumbo and Copycat and uses a permanent network of known mathematical facts, a working memory in the form of a cytoplasm, and a coderack containing codelets to produce free associations of bricks in order to arrive at the result.

=== Chapter 4: Highlevel Perception, Representation, and Analogy ===
The chapter subtitle A Critique of Artificial-intelligence Methodology indicates that this is a polemical article, in which David Chalmers, Robert French, and Hofstadter criticize most of the research going on at that time (the early '80s) as exaggerating results and missing the central features of human intelligence.

Some of these AI projects, like the structure mapping engine (SME), claimed to model high faculties of the human mind and to be able to understand literary analogies and to rediscover important scientific breakthroughs. In the introduction, Hofstadter warns about the Eliza effect that leads people to attribute understanding to a computer program that only uses a few stock phrases. The authors claim that the input data for such impressive results are already heavily structured in the direction of the intended discovery and only a simple matching task is left to the computer.

Their main claim is that it is impossible to model high-level cognition without at the same time modeling low-level perception. While cognition is necessarily based on perception, they argue that it in turn influences perception itself. Therefore, a sound AI project should try to model the two together. In a slogan repeated several times throughout the book: cognition is recognition.

Since human perception is too complex to be modelled by available technology, they favor the restriction of AI projects to limited domains like the one used for the Copycat project.

=== Chapter 5: The Copycat Project ===
This chapter presents, as stated in the full title, A Model of Mental Fluidity and Analogy-making. It is a description of the architecture of the Copycat program, developed by Hofstadter and Melanie Mitchell. The field of application of the program is a domain of short alphabetic sequences. A typical puzzle is: If abc were changed to abd, how would you change ijk in the same way?. The program tries to find an answer using a strategy supposedly similar to the way the human mind tackles the question.

Copycat has three major components:

- The Slipnet, a model of long-term memory in humans. It contains concepts of various degrees of abstraction, from the letter types to the notion of opposite. Concepts are connected with links indicating their similarity. The activation of a node may cause the activation of a neighbor with a probability proportional to the inverse of the length of their link. The lengths of these links are not static; they have a value at the beginning but they may change elastically during computation according to the partial results achieved.
- The Workspace, a model of short-term memory. Here partial structures are constructed and dismantled. The temporary results may cause the activation of concepts in the slipnet. A temperature measures the satisfaction of the program with the structure obtained at each moment. High temperature means dissatisfaction and leads to the adoption of a different strategy. Low temperature means satisfaction and the continuation of the present strategy.
- The Coderack, a collection of codelets, that is small fragments of code, that wait to be selected and executed in the workspace. Each has a weight associated to it that determined its probability to be selected for execution.

The resulting software displays emergent properties. It works according to a parallel terraced scan that runs several possible processes at the same time. It shows mental fluidity in that concepts may slip into similar ones. It emulates human behavior in tending to find the most obvious solutions most of the time but being more satisfied (as witnessed by low temperature) by more clever and deep answers that it finds more rarely.

=== Chapter 6: Perspectives on Copycat ===
This chapter compares Copycat with other recent (at the time) work in artificial intelligence. Specifically, it matches it with the claimed results from the structure mapping engine SME and the Analogical Constraint Mapping Engine (ACME). The authors' judgment is that those programs suffer from two defects: Their input is pre-structured by the developers to highlight the analogies that the software is supposed to find; and the general architecture of the programs is serial and deterministic rather than parallel and stochastic like Copycat's, which they consider psychologically more plausible.

Severe criticism is put on the claim that these tools can solve "real-life" problems. In fact, only the terms used in the example suggest that the input to the programs comes from a concrete situation. The logical structures don't actually imply any meaning for the term.

Finally a more positive assessment is given to two other projects: Indurkhya' PAN model and Kokinov's AMBR system.

=== Chapter 7: Prolegomena to Any Future Metacat ===
This chapter looks at those aspects of human creativity that are not yet modeled by Copycat and lays down a research plan for a future extension of the software. The main missing element is the mind's ability to observe itself and reflect on its own thinking process. Also important is the ability to learn and to remember the results of the mental activity.

The creativity displayed in finding analogies should be applicable at ever higher levels: making analogies between analogies (expression inspired by the title of a book by Stanislaw Ulam), analogies between these second-order analogies, and so on.

=== Chapter 8: Tabletop, BattleOp, Ob-Platte, Potelbat, Belpatto, Platobet ===
Another of Hofstadter's students, Robert French, was assigned the task of applying the architecture of Copycat to a different domain, consisting in analogies between objects lying on a table in a coffeehouse. The resulting program was named Tabletop.

The authors present a different and vaster domain to justify the relevance of attacking such a trivial-seeming project. The alternative domain is called Ob-Platte and consists in discovering analogies between geographical locations in different regions or countries.

Once again arguments are offered against a brute-force approach, which would work on the small Tabletop domain but would become unfeasible on the larger Ob-Platte domain. Instead a parallel non-deterministic architecture is used, similar to the one adopted by the Copycat project.

=== Chapter 9: The Emergent Personality of Tabletop, a Perception-based Model of Analogy-making ===
In the premise to the chapter, title The Knotty Problem of Evaluating Research, Hofstadter considers the question of how research in AI should be assessed. He argues against a strict adherence to a match between the results of an AI program with the average answer of human test subjects. He gives two reasons for his rejection: the AI program is supposed to emulate creativity, while an average of human responses will delete any original insight by any of the single subjects; and the architecture of the program should be more important that its mere functional description.

In the main article, the architecture of Tabletop is described: it is strongly inspired by that of Copycat and consists of a Slipnet, a Workspace, and a Corerack.

=== Chapter 10: Letter Spirit ===
This last chapter is about a more ambitious project that Hofstadter started with student Gary McGraw. The microdomain used is that of grid fonts: typographic alphabets constructed using a rigid system of small rigid components. The goal is to construct a program that, given only a few or just one letter from the grid font, can generate the whole alphabet in the same style. The difficulty lies in the ambiguity and undefinability of style. The projected program would have a structure very similar to that of Jumbo, Numbo, Copycat, and Tabletop. Online demos for the Letter Spirit project are available here and here.

=== Epilogue ===
In the concluding part of the book, Hofstadter analyses some AI projects with a critical eye. He finds that today's AI is missing the gist of human creativity and is making exaggerated claims. The project under scrutiny are the following.

AARON, a computer artist that can draw images of people in outdoor settings in a distinctive style reminiscent of that of a human artist; criticism: the program doesn't have any understanding of the objects it draws, it just uses some graphical algorithms with some randomness thrown in to generate different scenes at every run and to give the style a more natural feel.

Racter, a computer author that wrote a book entitled The Policeman's Beard Is Half Constructed. Although some of the prose generated by the program is quite impressive, due in part to the Eliza effect, the computer does not have any notion of plot or of the meaning of the words it uses. Furthermore, the book is made up of selected texts from thousands produced by the computer over several years.

AM, a computer mathematician that generates new mathematical concepts. It managed to produce by itself the notion of prime number and the Goldbach conjecture. As with Racter, the question is how much the programmer filtered the output of the program, keeping only the occasional interesting output. Also, mathematics being a very specialized domain, it is doubtful whether the techniques used can be abstracted to general cognition.

Another mathematical program, called Geometry, was celebrated for making an insightful discovery of an original proof that an isosceles triangle has equal base angles. The proof is based on seeing the triangle in two different ways. However, the program generates all possible ways of seeing the triangle, not even knowing that it is the same triangle.

Hofstadter concludes with some methodological remarks on the Turing Test. In his opinion it is still a good definition and he argues that by interacting with a program, a human may be able to have insight not just on its behaviour but also on its structure. However, he criticises the use that is made of it at present: it encourages the development of fancy natural-language interfaces instead of the investigation of deep cognitive faculties.

== Editions ==
- Hofstadter, Douglas R. (2008) [1995], Fluid Concepts and Creative Analogies: Computer Models of the Fundamental Mechanisms of Thought, Basic Books, ISBN 978-0786723317
