= Click analytics =

Special type of web analytics

Click analytics is a special type of web analytics that gives attention to clicks (Point-and-click) which constitute the first stage in the conversion funnel. Commonly, click analytics focuses on on-site analytics. An editor of a web site uses click analytics to determine the performance of his or her particular site, with regard to where the users of the site are clicking.

== Information ==
Click analytics may happen in real-time or "unreal"-time, depending on the type of information sought. Typically, front-page editors on high-traffic news media sites will want to monitor their pages in real-time, to optimize the content. Editors, designers and other stakeholders may analyze clicks on a wider time frame to aid them in assessing the performance of written passages, design elements or advertisements etc.

Click data may be gathered in at least two ways. Ideally, a click is "logged" when it occurs, and this method requires some functionality that picks up relevant information when the event occurs. Alternatively, one may institute the assumption that a page view is a result of a click, and therefore log a simulated click that leads to that page view.

== See also ==
- Click tracking
- Call to action (marketing)
- List of web analytics software
