= Call to action (marketing) =

Marketing term

Example of "call to action" buttons on a website

Call to action (CTA) is a marketing term for any text designed to prompt an immediate response or encourage an immediate sale. A CTA most often refers to the use of words or phrases that can be incorporated into sales scripts, advertising messages, or web pages, which compel an audience to act in a specific way.

== Definition ==
In marketing, a call to action (CTA) is an instruction to the audience designed to provoke an immediate response, usually using an imperative verb such as "call now", "find out more" or "visit a store today". Other types of calls to action might provide consumers with strong reasons for purchasing immediately, such an offer that is only available for a limited time (e.g. 'Offer must expire soon'; 'Limited stocks available') or a special deal usually accompanied by a time constraint (e.g. 'Order before midnight to receive a gift with your order'; 'Two for the price of one for the first 50 callers only'). The key to a powerful call to action is to provide consumers with compelling reasons to purchase promptly rather than defer purchase decisions. A CTA can be a simple, non-demanding request like "choose a colour" or "watch this video", or a much more demanding request. An obvious CTA would be a request for the consumer to purchase a product or provide personal details and contact information. A CTA often takes the form of a digital image that encourages a lead to move closer towards making a purchase. "Click here", "Download Now" and "Learn More" are all examples of CTAs online consumers are already familiar with.

== Applications ==
Many marketing materials, such as brochures, flyers, catalogs, email campaigns, also make use of a call to action. Such instructions are designed to show consumers how to take the next step and create a sense of urgency around the offer.

Successful sales representatives have long recognised that specific words and phrases can prompt desirable responses from prospects. Over time, they learn to incorporate the best lines into effective sales scripts. Clever sales pitches often incorporate a series of small CTAs that lead to a final, more significant CTA. These smaller CTAs create a pattern of behaviour that makes it easier for the prospect to follow-through with a larger CTA when it comes. An example could be the purchase of a designer timepiece. The salesperson might ask the consumer to choose a style, then a colour, a size and even a personalised engraving. When the client views the personalised design, they are more likely to complete the purchase. The sales representative can close the sale by asking, "Will that be cash or credit, today?"

Advertising messages, especially direct-response advertising messages, often make extensive use of calls to action. The key to a powerful call to action is to provide consumers with compelling reasons to purchase promptly rather than defer purchase decisions. An article in the Wall Street Journal suggests that the incidence of calls to action in television advertisements is increasing due to marketers' desire for instant and measurable results.

In web design, a CTA may be a banner, button, or some graphic or text on a website meant to prompt a user to click it and continue down a conversion funnel. It is an essential part of inbound marketing as well as permission marketing in that it actively strives to convert a user into a lead and later into a customer. The main goal of a CTA is a click, or a scan in the case of a QR code, and its success can be measured with a click-through rate, a conversion rate formula that calculates the number of clicks over the times the CTA was seen. Another way to test the effectiveness of a CTA is using A/B testing where several graphics are presented to users and the graphic with the highest success rate becomes the default.

A call to action is often used in email marketing, a form of media sent directly to consumers that typically raises awareness for a sale, event, promotion, or release. The call to action is usually included in the subject line to gain consumer's interest to open the email.

Calls to action evolve as society evolves. The concept is hyper focused around the consumer and must meet the consumer where they are rather than suggesting the consumer adjusts their behavior to the business or company. Marketing professionals must keep up to date on current events and how their target market is responding to said events to ensure appropriate messaging of their call to action in relation to the context. Extreme traumatic events may cause a call to action to be less business related and more society related. On the other hand, marketers must also note interesting changes in their target audience. When an audience engages with an activity or trend more, marketers must evolve call to action messages and connect with their consumers by using their new interests.

A call to action can be both direct and indirect. Pathos reasoning is a strong and indirect tactic marketers use for consumers to emotionally connect with their message. While the consumer may not be directly engaging with the company through a purchase, a positive emotional connection through a pathos call to action leverages the business in the consumer's mind and may lead to future purchases or brand loyalty. It is a common misconception that purchase is the most important result from a call to action, emotional engagement for brand loyalty can be equally essential.

== See also ==
- Advertising management
- Consumer behaviour
- Personal selling
