= Yasodara Córdova =

Yaso Córdova
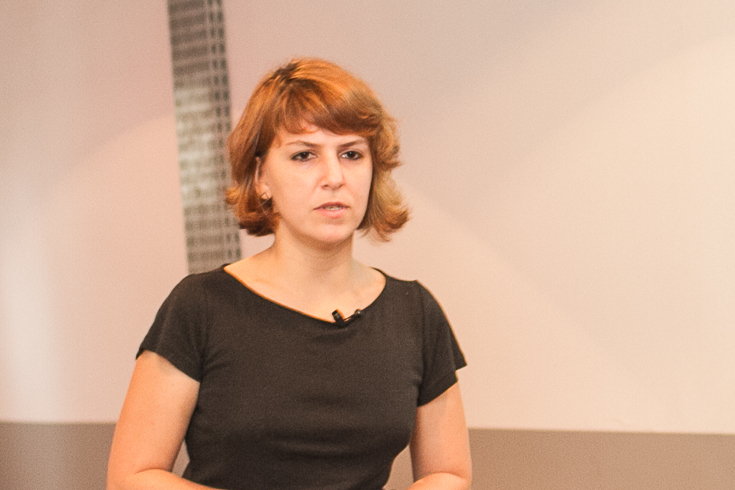
- Born: Yasodara Córdova; 17 September 1980 (age 46); Brazil
- Education: University of Brasília, Fundação Getúlio Vargas
- Known for: Open Data
- Awards: Vladimir Herzog Award (twice)
- Scientific career
- Fields: Open Data, Open Standards, Privacy
- Workplaces: Berkman Klein Center for Internet & Society at Harvard University and Harvard Kennedy School

Yasodara Córdova (born 1980), also known as Yaso, is an activist, coder, designer and researcher. Her work has focused on technologies to improve the democratic process, using open data, online identity, and privacy approaches. She is currently a research fellow at the Digital Harvard Kennedy School, and affiliate to the Berkman Klein Center at Harvard. She has been part of several Ministries in Brazil, the United Nations and the W3C. As an activist, she is co-founder and advisor of multiple initiatives around Internet hacktivism.

== Career ==
Córdova studied Industrial Design at the Federal University of Brasilia, completed an MBA at the Fundação Getúlio Vargas and earned a MPA at Harvard Kennedy School in 2022. She is a self taught developer. Since 2006, she worked in the Brazilian public news agency Agência Brasil, first as datavis designer and developer, later as product and then project manager. Her team managed to make the agency a reference for new ways of information interaction, using hypervideo tutorials, newsgames and citizen journalism. Her team won two consecutive times the Vladimir Herzog Award, for human rights and Journalism in Brazil, in the categories Internet (webdocumentary "Nação Palmares") and Cultural Illiteracy (series of articles "O Analfabetismo, a exclusão pelas letras"). She also participated in three other works ("Terra Invadida", "Terra Dividida", "Usinas do Rio Madeira: problema ou solução") that were finalists in the Caixa award of social journalism editions of 2007 and 2008.

In the subsequent period, from a position in the United Nations' UNESCO, Córdova developed and pushed forward several public participation processes within several Ministries in the Brazil Government led by the Workers' Party. In the Secretariat of Digital Culture at the Ministry of Culture, she developed software for the public consultations of the Brazilian Civil Rights Framework for the Internet and for The Copyright Law reform. At the same Secretariat she worked on projects for multimedia access and archiving, using technologies for decentralization.. This work was presented at the International Symposium of Public Policies for Digital Collections. Afterwards, under the Secretariat for Legislative Affairs of the Ministry of Justice she developed the public participation platform for the Ministry. This work led her to join the Youth National Secretariat of the Presidency of the Republic, where she expanded her work on public participation delivering the specifications of the Participatory Observatory for Youth, which once implemented received the prize A Rede.

From 2012 to 2016 Córdova joined the World Wide Web Consortium (W3C) as project leader, participating in the Web Payments Task Force and being Co-Chair of the Working Group on Best Practices for Data on the Web, which produced the W3C Recommendation "Data on the Web Best Practices", the "W3C Data Quality Vocabulary" and the "W3C Dataset Usage Vocabulary" under her guidance. During this time, she also led the development of the Open Data for Development Network platform or the W3C Brazil project of Artificial Intelligence applied to participatory processes. She translated the "Architecture of the World Wide Web, volume 1" to Brazilian Portuguese.

In 2016, Córdova was appointed fellow of the Berkman Klein Center for Internet and Society (Harvard University), where she has been doing research around open data, online identity and algorithmic governance, with an IEEE publication and co-organizing the workshop "Algorithms, Law and Society: Building Rights for a Digital Era". She has also continued her work on open data standards as part of the Beneficial Ownership Data Standard by the Web Foundation. In 2017, she was appointed fellow as part of the first promotion of fellows in the Digital HKS at the Harvard Kennedy School of Government.

== Activism and social engagement ==
Her early activist engagement was pushing forward several hacktivist initiatives. She was the co-founder of the Calango Hackerspace, the second in Brazil and first to have a woman as co-founder. She has been engaged with Metareciclagem, an activist network around DIY and sustainability, in the frame of which she co-organized the First International Conference on Collaborative Environmental Management or the Tropixel Festival.

She was a member of the advisory board of the Open Knowledge Foundation (Brazil chapter) until March 2017 and currently sits on the Advisory Board of the Coding Rights think tank, part of the Privacy International Network. Within Coding Rights, she is the author of a series on Online Identity, and she contributed to the "Sexy nudes: a sexy guide to digital security". Coding Rights won the FRIDA prize on Digital Innovation in LatAm in 2017.

She is former director and current advisor of the initiative Serenata de Amor, which uses machine learning and open data to facilitate social control of the public representatives. Yasodara was invited to present the anti-corruption project's progress in the Brazilian Congress in 2017.

== See also ==
- Hacktivism
- World Wide Web Consortium
- Brazilian Civil Rights Framework for the Internet
- Open Knowledge Foundation
- Vladimir Herzog Award
