= Click path =

User behavior journey in virtual space

A click path or clickstream is the sequence of hyperlinks one or more website visitors follows on a given site, presented in the order viewed. A visitor's click path may start within the website or at a separate third party website, often a search engine results page, and it continues as a sequence of successive webpages visited by the user. Click paths take call data and can match it to ad sources, keywords, and/or referring domains, in order to capture data.

Clickstream analysis is useful for web activity analysis, software testing, market research, and for analyzing employee productivity.

== Information storage ==
While navigating the World Wide Web, a "user agent" (web browser) makes requests to another computer, known as a web server, every time the user selects a hyperlink. Most web servers store information about the sequence of links that a user "clicks through" while visiting the websites that they host in log files for the site operator's benefit. The information of interest can vary and may include information downloaded, webpage visited previously, webpage visited afterwards, duration of time spent on page, etc. The information is most useful when the client/user is identified, which can be done through website registration or record matching through the client's Internet service provider (ISP). Storage can also occur in a router, proxy server, or ad server.

== Data analysis ==
Data mining, column-oriented DBMS, and integrated OLAP systems can be used in conjunction with clickstreams to better record and analyze this data.

== Privacy ==
Use of clickstream data can raise privacy concerns, especially since some Internet service providers have resorted to selling users' clickstream data as a way to enhance revenue. There are 10-12 companies that purchase this data, typically for about $0.40/month per user. While this practice may not directly identify individual users, it is often possible to indirectly identify specific users, an example being the AOL search data scandal. Most consumers are unaware of this practice, and its potential for compromising their privacy. In addition, few ISPs publicly admit to this practice.

As the world of online shopping grows, it is becoming easier for the privacy of individuals to become exploited. There have many cases of email addresses, phone numbers, and other personal information that have been stolen illegally from shoppers, clients, and many more to be used by third parties. These third parties can range from advertisers to hackers. There are consumers who actually benefit from this by gaining more targeted advertising and deals, but most are harmed by the lack of privacy. As the world of technology grows, consumers are more and more in risk of losing privacy.

== Applications ==
Clickstreams can be used to allow the user to see where they have been and allow them to easily return to a page they have already visited, a function that is already incorporated in most browsers. Clickstream can display the specific time and position that individuals browsed and closed the website, all the web pages they viewed, the duration they spent on each page, and it can also show which pages are viewed most frequently. There is abundant information to be analyzed, individuals can check visitors clickstream in association with other statistical information, such as: visiting length, retrieval words, ISP, countries, explorers, etc. This process enables individuals to know their visitors deeply.

Webmasters can gain insight into what visitors on their site are doing by using the clickstream. This data itself is "neutral" in the sense that any dataset is neutral. The data can be used in various scenarios, one of which is marketing. Additionally, any webmaster, researcher, blogger or person with a website can learn about how to improve their site.

The growing e-commerce industry has made it necessary to tailor to the needs and preferences of consumers. Click path data can be used to personalize product offerings. By using previous click path data, websites can predict what products the user is likely to purchase. Click path data can contain information about the user's goals, interests, and knowledge and therefore can be used to predict their future actions and decisions. By using statistical models, websites can potentially increase their operating profits by streamlining results based on what the user is most likely to purchase.

Analyzing the data of clients that visit a company website can be important in order to remain competitive. This analysis can be used to generate two findings for the company, the first being an analysis of a user's clickstream while using a website to reveal usage patterns, which in turn gives a heightened understanding of customer behaviour. This use of the analysis creates a user profile that aids in understanding the types of people that visit a company's website. As discussed in Van den Poel & Buckinx (2005), clickstream analysis can be used to predict whether a customer is likely to purchase from an e-commerce website. Clickstream analysis can also be used to improve customer satisfaction with the website and with the company itself. This can generate a business advantage, and be used to assess the effectiveness of advertising on a web page or site.

== Implications ==
Most websites store data about visitors to the site through click path. The information is typically used to improve the website and deliver personalized and more relevant content. In addition, the data results can not only be used by a designer to review, improve or redesign their website, but can also be used to model a user's browsing behaviour. In the online world of e-commerce, information collected through click path allows advertisers to construct personal profiles and use them to individually target consumers much more effectively than ever before; as a result, advertisers create more relevant advertising and efficiently spend advertising dollars. Meanwhile, in the wrong hands click path data poses a serious threat to personal privacy.

Unauthorized clickstream data collection is considered to be spyware. However, authorized clickstream data collection comes from organizations that use opt-in panels to generate market research using panelists who agree to share their clickstream data with other companies by downloading and installing specialized clickstream collection agents.

== Challenges ==
The number of paths a user can potentially take greatly increases depending on the number of pages on that particular website. Many tools to determine path analysis are too linear and do not account for the complexity of internet usage. In most cases, less than 5% of users follow the most common path. However, even if all users used the same path, there is still no way to tell which page is the most influential in determining behavior. Even in more linear forms of path analysis, where they can see where most customers drop off the website, the "why?" factor is still missed. The main challenge of path analysis lies in the fact that it tries to regulate and force users to follow a certain path, when in reality users are very diverse and have specific preference and opinions.

== See also ==
- Click tracking
- Conversion rate optimization
- Keystroke logging
- Phorm
- Real-time marketing
- Software asset management
