= Operation Serenata de Amor =

- Type of project: Cyber Activism
- Location: Brazil
- Established: 2016
- Website: serenata.ai

Operation Serenata de Amor is an artificial intelligence project designed to analyze public spending in Brazil. The project has been funded by a recurrent financing campaign since September 7, 2016, and came in the wake of major scandals of misappropriation of public funds in Brazil, such as the Mensalão scandal and what was revealed in the Operation Car Wash investigations.

The analysis began with data from the National Congress then expanded to other types of budget and instances of government, such as the Federal Senate. The project is built through collaboration on GitHub and using a public group with more than 600 participants on Telegram.

The name "Serenata de Amor," which means "serenade of love," was taken from a popular cashew cream bonbon produced by Chocolates Garoto in Brazil.

== Modules ==
Throughout development of the project, new modules have been newly introduced in addition to the main repository:

- The main repository, serenata-de-amor, serves as the starting point for investigative work.
- Rosie is the robot programmed to identify public funds expenses with discrepancies, starting with CEAP (Quota for Exercise of Parliamentary Activity); it analyzes each of the reimbursements requested by the deputies and senators, indicating the reasons that lead it to believe they are suspicious.
- From Rosie was born whistleblower, which tweets under the name of @RosieDaSerenata, distributing the results found on social media.
- Jarbas (Github repository) is a data visualization tool which shows a complete list of reimbursements made available by the Chamber of Deputies and mined by Rosie.
- Toolbox is a Python installable package that supports the development of Serenata de Amor and Rosie.

== History ==
Operation Serenata de Amor is an Artificial intelligence project for analysis of public expenditures. It was conceived in March 2016 by data scientist Irio Musskopf, sociologist Eduardo Cuducos and entrepreneur Felipe Cabral. The project was financed collectively in the Catarse platform, where it reached 131% of the collection goal paying 3 months of project development. Ana Schwendler, also a data scientist, Pedro Vilanova "Tonny", data journalist, Bruno Pazzim, software engineer, Filipe Linhares, a frontend engineer, Leandro Devegili, an entrepreneur and André Pinho took the first steps towards constructing the platform, such as collecting and structuring the first datasets.

Jessica Temporal, data scientist and Yasodara Córdova "Yaso", researcher, Tatiana Balachova "Russa", UX designer, joined the project after the financing took place.

The members created a recurring financing campaign, expanding the analysis of public spending to the Federal Senate. Donors make monthly payments ranging from 5 BRL to 200 BRL to maintain group activities. The monthly amount collected is around 10,000 BRL.

== Results ==
In January 2017, concluding the period financed by the initial campaign, the group carried out an investigation into the suspicious activities found by the data analysis system. 629 complaints were made to the Ombudsman's Office of the Chamber of Deputies, questioning expenses of 216 federal deputies. In addition, the Facebook project page has more than 25,000 followers, and users frequently cite the operation as a benchmark in transparency in the Brazilian government. One of the examples of results obtained by the operation is the case of the Deputy who had to return about 700 BRL to the House after his expenses were analyzed by the platform.

The platform was able to analyze more than 3 million notes, raising about 8,000 suspected cases in public spending. The community that supports the work of the team benefits from open source repositories, with licenses open for the collaboration. So much so that the two main data scientists of the project presented it at the CivicTechFest in Taipei, obtaining several mentions even in the international press. The technical leader presented the project in Poland during DevConf2017 in Kraków. It was also presented in the Google News Lab in 2017. It was presented by Yaso, when she was the Director of the initiative, at the MIT Media Lab/Berkman Klein Center Initiative for Artificial Intelligence ethics, and at the Artificial Intelligence and Inclusion Symposium, an initiative of the Global Network of Internet & Society Centers (NoC). It was also presented both by Irio and Yaso at the Digital Harvard Kennedy School, over a lunch seminar, where the transparency of the platform and the main solutions found were discussed, so that the code and data are always available to verify its suitability. This infographic provides information about the first results of Operation Serenata de Amor, a project that analyzes open data on public spending to find discrepancies.

The project was presented by Yaso to the House Audit and Control Committee of the Chamber of Deputies in August 2017, and raised the interest of House officials who work with open data.

The operation has been a source of inspiration for other civic projects that aim to work with similar goals, demonstrating the broader impact of artificial intelligence also in industry in Brazil. Participation of several team members in events throughout Brazil and abroad can be found on the Internet, such as presentation at OpenDataDay, held at Calango Hackerspace in the Federal District, Campus Party Bahia, Campus Party Brasilia, Friends of Tomorrow, XIII National Meeting of Internal Control, in the event USP Talks Hackfest against corruption in João Pessoa, the latter being also highlighted in the National Press.

== See also ==
- Internet activism
- List of scandals in Brazil
- Open government
