= MIT Media Lab Object-Based Media =

The Object-Based Media Group at the MIT Media Lab, formerly led by V. Michael Bove, Jr., explored the creative and technological applications and implications of the intersection of context-aware consumer electronics and self-aware digital content. Projects included immersive, interactive, and personalized television, 3-D display technologies (in particular computer generated holography), novel user interfaces, and applications that run on ecosystems of consumer electronics devices. Graduate students in the group typically had backgrounds in signal processing and understanding, image capture and display (especially in 3-D), user interfaces, technical and creative aspects of new media forms, and/or consumer electronics product design.

Bove was ousted in a #MeToo incident in the fall of 2019.
