= MindsHub =

Platform for building AI from enterprise data

- Type: Private
- Industry: Artificial intelligence, Software
- Founded: 2017
- Founders: Jorge Torres, Adam Carrigan
- Headquarters: Berkeley, California, U.S.
- Area served: Worldwide
- Products: Federated query engine, semantic search, AI data agents
- Website: https://mindsdb.com

MindsHub is an open-source artificial intelligence software platform that enables organizations to analyze both structured and unstructured data without requiring it to be moved into a separate storage system. It connects to existing databases, business applications, and document-based sources, allowing information to be queried directly from its current location.

== History ==
MindsHub was founded in 2017 as MindsDB by Jorge Torres and Adam Carrigan in Berkeley, California. The first open-source release in 2018 introduced basic machine-learning functions that operated inside traditional databases. From 2019 to 2024, the project expanded into a broader system for accessing distributed enterprise data. Independent technology publications referenced MindsHub during this period in the context of AI infrastructure and data engineering tools.

Between 2024 and 2025, MindsHub added features for working with large language models (LLMs) and retrieval-augmented generation, positioning the platform as an open-source engine for running AI queries across different data systems.

== Technology ==
=== Federated data access ===
MindsHub offers a federated query engine – a system that allows SQL queries to run across multiple databases, business applications, and document-based sources without combining the data into one central repository. This makes it possible to analyze live operational information while it remains in its original location.

=== Document and file search ===
MindsHub provides tools for managing and searching unstructured content such as documents and text fields:

- vector search – a method for finding similar content by comparing numerical representations of text
- metadata filtering – narrowing search results by attributes such as date or category

=== AI data agents ===
MindsHub includes AI-based agents that interpret natural-language questions, generate SQL queries, retrieve context, and produce answers using large language models. These agents act as intermediaries that translate everyday language into database operations.

=== Models and integrations ===
As of September 2024, the platform supports over 200 integrations, including data platforms such as MySQL, PostgreSQL, Snowflake, and MongoDB. MindsHub also integrates with a wide range of applications, including Salesforce, HubSpot, X(former Twitter), and many others.

== Deployment ==
MindsHub is available as open-source software and as a hosted cloud service. It can also be deployed on-premises or inside private cloud environments, depending on an organization's requirements. Independent financial and technology reporting has covered several integration and reseller agreements involving MindsHub. The platform can additionally operate as a Model Context Protocol (MCP) server, allowing MCP-compatible developer tools to access its query engine and AI functions. MindsHub is listed as an optional integration within the Google MCP Toolbox.
