= Toussaint Loua =

French statistician (1824–1907)

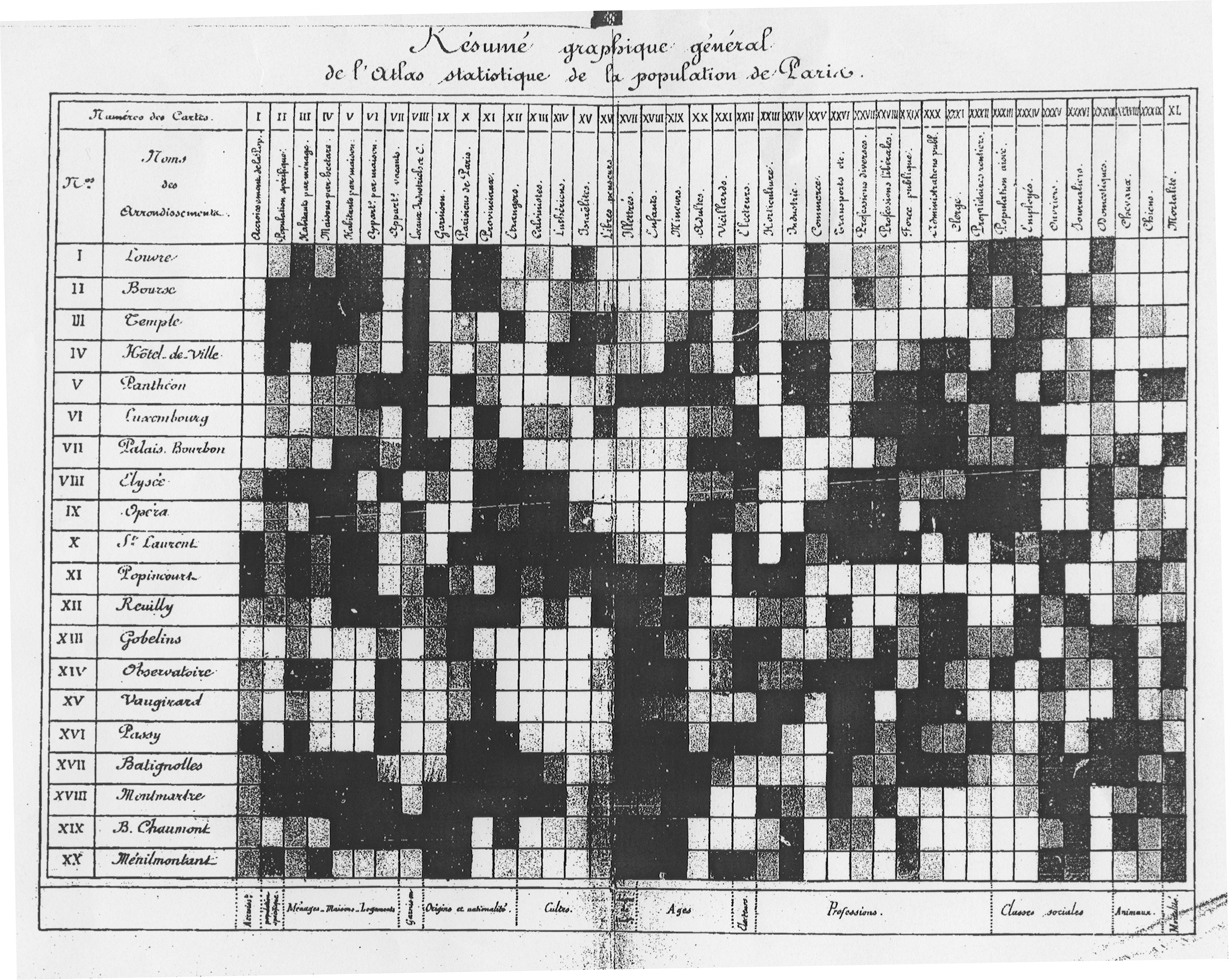
General graphic summary of the Statistical Atlas of the population of Paris. It is one of the first graphical representation of data in the form of a heat map.

Toussaint Loua (1824 – 1907) was a French statistician and was credited for inventing the heat map in information visualization.

== Career ==
Loua was born in Saarn in modern day Germany.

He began his career as a clerk at the Ministry of Commerce in 1850 at the age of 26. From 1875 to 1887, Loua directed the General Directorate of Statistics of France (French: Statistique générale de la France). Under his direction, the SGF published in 1878 the first Statistical Yearbook of France (French: Annuaire statistique de la France) and it was also under its mandate that in 1885 the High Council of Statistics was created.

== Bibliography ==
- 1865 : De la mortalité à Paris dans ses rapports, Berger-Levrault (Paris)
- 1865 : Mémoire sur quelques questions de statistique
- 1867 : « De l'influence des disettes sur les mouvements de la population », Journal de la société de statistique de Paris, vol. 8, pages 94–97, url
- 1873 : Atlas statistique de la population de Paris, J. Dejey (Paris), Version digitale
- 1877 : « Les faillites en France depuis 1840 », Journal de la société de statistique de Paris, vol. 18, pages 281-291.
- 1877 : « Le Divorce en Belgique », Journal de la société de statistique de Paris, vol. 18, pages 155-158, url
- 1879 : Les Logements insalubres à Paris, Berger-Levrault (Paris)
- 1885 : Les Déplacements de la population en France, Berger-Levrault (Paris)
- Loua, M. Toussaint (1886). "Statistical Review of the Present Position of Italy". Journal of the Statistical Society of London. 49 (3): 662–672. ISSN 0959-5341. JSTOR 2979298.
- 1888 : La France sociale et économique d'après les documents officiels les plus récents, Paris : Berger-Levrault
- 1889 : « À propos de l'exposition universelle de 1889 », Journal de la société de statistique de Paris, vol. 30, pages 325-330, url
