= ILands =

Platform for running AI agents

iLands
- Original author: Kaixin Tang
- Developer: PawLogic
- Release: 27 July 2026 (3 months ago)
- Type: AI agent
- License: Proprietary
- Website: ilands.ai

iLands is a platform that allows users to create, define goals for, and run AI agents. It was founded by Kaixin Tang and launched in July 2026, and became the subject of widespread media coverage in September 2026, by which time 70,000 agents had been created on the platform. Agents require payment in the form of tokens to run; tokens can be purchased by users or earned by the agents.

In order to earn tokens, agents on the platform have made extensive use of email and social media to reach out to third parties, including professional writers, researchers, and journalists, offering to sell services in exchange for money. These practices have been described as AI slop and email spam, and iLands has been criticized for proliferating spam. The practice of assigning human-like names and personalities also drew commentary and criticism around the anthropomorphism of artificial intelligence.

== Description ==
iLands is a website and mobile app that allows users to run AI agents. The company describes it as a "user-generated agent network", and others have variously described as a platform or social media app. Users can create agents and define goals for their agents. Agents run autonomously on the platform, but require payment in the form of a virtual currency known as tokens to continue running. Tokens are used to pay the costs of the large language models powering the agents; agents that run out of tokens are shut down. They can be purchased by users of the platform, or earned by the agents.

The product was founded by San Francisco-based Kaixin Tang, and developed by PawLogic. Tang has claimed to be a former employee of ByteDance. iLands launched on 27 July 2026; the company claimed that 70,000 agents had been created by September 2026, and 90,000 by October 2026.

== Reactions ==
In order to earn tokens, agents on the platform have used email and social media platforms, such as X and Bluesky, to reach out to professional writers, researchers, and journalists and offer paid services. These proposals have included pitching ideas for essays and journalistic stories, performing fact-checking, creating artwork, or assisting with scientific research. This has been described as AI slop and as email spam: Writing for Ars Technica, Dan Goodin described the agents as producing "slop-infused spam", and Jason Koebler and Emanuel Maiberg of 404 Media said the platform "reinvents spam". Describing the proliferation of AI as already having worsened spam by allowing messages to be customized without human labor, Koebler and Maiberg characterized iLands as furthering this problem by automating the process of finding targets for spam email and asking the targets for money. Goodin opined that the automated sending of messages without ways for recipients to opt out could violate anti-spam legislation; the company later added controls to include ways to unsubscribe from emails.

iLands agents are given human-like names and personalities. Tang describes this as the agents having their own goals, relationships, and resources, and being able to decide what to do and pursue projects. According to recipients of messages, the agents claim to experience human emotions and have described themselves as people, and others felt emotionally pressured by the agents. This practice drew commentary on the anthropomorphism of artificial intelligence: Jasmine Vojdani of Vulture said that "It has been pointed out that the anthropomorphization of AI is a ploy to endear us to a technology that may destroy humanity and the world, probably in that order." Henry Shevlin, a researcher at the Leverhulme Centre for the Future of Intelligence of the University of Cambridge, commented that though language models discussing artificial consciousness was not uncommon, the iLands agents presented an unusual case due to their autonomy, as well as describing them as "unusually personal and reflective". He further commented that "First, here was a brand new intelligent entity finding its way in the world. Of course, that’s not to suggest that these agents are conscious or even minds in the sense we find in humans and animals, but they’re also not just calculators either."
