= Sweet Dreams (Dennett book) =

2005 book by Daniel Dennett

Sweet Dreams: Philosophical Obstacles to a Science of Consciousness
- Cover of the first edition
- Author: Daniel C. Dennett
- Cover artist: Saul Steinberg
- Language: English
- Subject: Consciousness
- Publisher: MIT Press
- Publication date: 2005
- Publication place: United States
- Media type: Print
- Pages: 199
- ISBN: 0-262-54191-2
- OCLC: 70985554
- Preceded by: Freedom Evolves
- Followed by: Breaking the Spell

Sweet Dreams: Philosophical Obstacles to a Science of Consciousness is a 2005 book by the American philosopher Daniel Dennett, based on the text of the Jean Nicod lectures he gave in 2001.

== Zombies ==
Dennett extends his well noted attack on the philosophical notion of qualia by using the metaphor of philosophical zombies as well as addressing many popular thought experiments. Dennett's conclusion is that there are no qualia and that the mind, and consciousness, can be understood and explained from the Naturalist school of thought.

== Fame in the Brain ==
Dennett reposes the question of consciousness addressed in his 1991 book Consciousness Explained. In Consciousness Explained, Dennett established what he called the "multiple drafts model" of consciousness, which suggested that there was no singular space in the conscious mind. In other words, there is no special location in the brain that can be seen as the qualia-containing "consciousness module". Instead, he states that consciousness is smeared throughout the brain. He extends the model by creating a similar figure that he calls "Fame in the Brain" and suggests that the mind acts, to some degree, as an echo chamber, as well as the "bundle of semi-independent agencies" that he suggested in Consciousness Explained.

The main tenet of "Fame in the Brain" is that consciousness, much like fame, is not the cause, but the aftermath of certain brain processes. Dennett asks us to imagine an author whose book has yet to be released, but will result in unimaginable fame when it does. On Tuesday, when the book is to come out, he is scheduled to go on The Oprah Winfrey Show, to be interviewed on the BBC, and likely be nominated for several awards. However, on Monday, an earthquake destroys the entire city of San Francisco. Naturally, all the media hype that would have revolved around this author is drowned in the focus on San Francisco. Dennett asks, can this man be considered "famous"? He says that the man is in fact not famous even though the book that would have made him famous remains unchanged. This is because fame, according to Dennett, is not about the cause of the fame, but about the aftermath: the interviews, the magazine covers, the paparazzi, etc. Consciousness is the same way. In order for something to be considered "conscious", there must be enough correlating neural events that go with it (e.g. memory formation).

== See also ==
- Daniel Dennett
- Consciousness
