= Cartesian materialism =

Concept in philosophy of mind

Objects experienced are represented within the mind of the observer (see Cartesian theater).

In philosophy of mind, cartesian materialism, a term coined by Daniel Dennett, views consciousness as tied to one or more specific brain areas that capture our subjective experience. Despite its name, this idea was not held by René Descartes, who instead advocated substance dualism—the separation of mind and body as distinct entities.

In its simplest form, Cartesian materialism suggests there is a dedicated "place" in the brain, called as the Cartesian theater by Dennett, where a unified representation of everything we consciously perceive—sights, sounds, smells, and more—exists at any given moment. According to this view, a hypothetical observer could locate the contents of consciousness in this privileged neural space, while anything outside it remains unconscious.

== History ==
=== Multiple meanings ===
French materialism developed from the mechanism of Descartes and the empiricism of Locke, Hobbes, Bacon and ultimately Duns Scotus who asked "Whether matter could not think?" Natural science, in their view, owes to the former its great success as a "Cartesian materialism", bereft of the metaphysics of Cartesian dualism by philosophers and physicians such as Regius, Cabanis, and La Mettrie, who maintained the viability of Descartes' biological automata without recourse to immaterial cognition.

However, philosopher Daniel Dennett uses the term to emphasize what he considers the pervasive Cartesian notion of a centralized repository of conscious experience in the brain. Dennett says that "Cartesian materialism is the view that there is a crucial finish line or boundary somewhere in the brain, marking a place where the order of arrival equals the order of 'presentation' in experience because what happens there is what you are conscious of."

Other modern philosophers have generally used less specific definitions. For example, O'Brien and Opie define it as the idea that consciousness is "realized in the physical materials of the brain", and W. Teed Rockwell defines Cartesian materialism in the following way: "The basic dogma of Cartesian materialism is that only neural activity in the cranium is functionally essential for the emergence of mind." However, although Rockwell's concept of Cartesian materialism is less specific in a sense, it is a detailed reply to Dennett's version, not an undeveloped predecessor. The main theme of Rockwell's book Neither Brain nor Ghost is that the arguments Dennett uses to refute his version of Cartesian materialism actually support the view that the mind is an emergent property of the entire Brain/Body/World Nexus. For Rockwell, claiming the entire brain is identical to the mind has no better justification than claiming that part of the brain is identical to the mind.

Dennett's version of the term is the most popular.

=== Cartesian dualism ===
Descartes believed that a human being was composed of both a material body and an immaterial soul (or "mind"). According to Descartes, the mind and the body could interact. The body can affect the mind; for example, when you place your hand in a fire, the body relays sensory information from your hand to your mind, which results in your having the experience of pain. Similarly, the mind can affect the body; for example, you can decide to move your hand and your muscles obey, moving your hand as you desired.

Descartes noted that, although our two eyes independently see an object, our conscious experience is not of two separate fields of vision each possessing an image of the object. Rather, we seem to experience one continuous, oval-shaped field of vision that possesses information from both eyes which seems to have somehow been 'merged' into a single image. (Consider in a movie, when a character looks through binoculars and the audience is shown what he is looking at, from the character's point of view. The image shown is never made up of two completely separate circular images-- rather the director shows us a single figure-eight shaped region made up of information from each eyepiece.)

Descartes noted that information from both eyes seems to have been merged somehow before "entering" conscious perception. He also noted similar effects for the other senses. Based on this, Descartes hypothesized that there must be some single place in the brain where all the sensory information is assembled, before finally being relayed to the immaterial mind.

His best candidate for this location was the pineal gland, since he thought it was the only part of the brain that is a single structure, rather than one duplicated on both the left and right halves of the brain. Descartes therefore believed that the pineal gland was the "seat of the soul" and that any information that was to "enter" consciousness had to pass through the pineal gland before it could enter the mind. In his perspective, the pineal gland is the place where all information "comes together."

=== Dennett's account of Cartesian materialism ===
At the present time, the consensus of scientists and philosophers is to reject dualism and its immaterial mind, for a variety of reasons. (See Dualism -- Arguments Against). Similarly, many other aspects of Descartes' theories have been rejected; for example, the pineal gland turned out to be endocrinological, rather than having a large role in information processing.

According to Daniel Dennett, however, many scientists and philosophers still believe, either explicitly or implicitly, in Descartes' idea of some centralized repository where the contents of consciousness are merged and assembled, a place he calls the Cartesian theater.

In his book Consciousness Explained (1991), Dennett writes:

Let's call the idea of such a centered locus in the brain Cartesian materialism, since it's the view you arrive at when you discard Descartes' dualism but fail to discard the imagery of a central (but material) Theater where it "all comes together"

Although this central repository is often called a "place" or a "location", Dennett is quick to clarify that Cartesian materialism's "centered locus" need not be anatomically defined-- such a locus might consists of a network of diverse regions.

== Dennett's arguments against Cartesian materialism ==
In Consciousness Explained, Dennett offers several lines of evidence to refute Cartesian materialism.

=== Timing anomalies of conscious experience ===
Another argument against Cartesian materialism is inspired by the results of several scientific experiments in the fields of psychology and neuroscience. In experiments that demonstrate the color phi phenomenon and the metacontrast effect, two stimuli are rapidly flashed on a screen, one after the other. Amazingly, the second stimulus can, in some cases, actually affect the perception of the first stimulus. In other experiments conducted by Benjamin Libet, two electrical stimulations are delivered, one after another, to a conscious subject. Under some conditions, subjects report having felt the second stimulation before they felt the first stimulation.

These experiments call into question the idea that brain states are directly translatable into the contents of consciousness. How can the second stimuli be 'projected backwards in time', such that it can affect the perception of things that occurred before the second stimulus was even administered?

=== Two attempted explanations ===
Two different types of explanations have been offered in response to the timing anomalies. One is that perhaps sensory information is assembled into a buffer before being passed on to consciousness after a substantial time delay. Since consciousness occurs only after a time lag, the incoming second stimulus would have time to affect the stored information about the first stimulus. In this view, subjects correctly remember their having had inaccurate experiences. Dennett calls this the "Stalinesque Explanation" (after the Stalinist Soviet Union's show trials that presented manufactured evidence to an unwitting jury).

A second explanation for the timing takes the opposite tack. Perhaps the subjects, contrary to their own reports, initially experienced the first stimulus as being prior to and untainted by the second stimulus. However, when subjects were later asked to recall what their experiences had been, they found that their memories of the first stimulus had been tainted by the second stimulus. Therefore, they inaccurately report experiences that never actually occurred. In this view, subjects have accurate initial experiences, but inaccurately remember them. Dennett calls this view the "Orwellian Explanation", after George Orwell's novel 1984, in which a totalitarian government frequently rewrites history to suit its purposes.

How are we to choose which of these two explanations is the correct one? Both explanations seem to adequately explain the given data, both seem to make the same predictions. Dennett sees no principled basis for choosing either of the explanations, so he rejects their common assumption of a theater. He says:

We can suppose, both theorists have exactly the same theory of what happens in your brain; they agree about just where and when in the brain the mistaken content enters the causal pathways; they just disagree about whether that location is to be deemed pre-experiential or post-experiential. [...] They even agree about how it ought to "feel" to subjects: Subjects should be unable to tell the difference between misbegotten experiences and immediately misremembered experiences.

=== Dennett's conclusions ===
Dennett's argument has the following basic structure:

1. If Cartesian materialism were true and there really was a special brain area (or areas) that stored the contents of conscious experience, then it should be possible to ascertain exactly when something enters conscious experience.

2. It is impossible, even in theory, to ever precisely determine when something enters conscious experience.

3. Therefore, Cartesian materialism is false.

According to Dennett, the debate between Stalinesque and Orwellian explanations is unresolvable — no amount of scientific information could ever answer the question. Dennett therefore argues (in accord with the philosophical doctrine of verificationism) that, since the differences between the two explanations are unresolvable, the point of disagreement is logically meaningless so both explanations are mistaken.

Dennett feels that the insistence on a place where 'it all comes together' (the Cartesian theater) is fundamentally flawed, and therefore that Cartesian materialism is false. Dennett's view is that "there is no single, definitive 'stream of consciousness,' because there is no central Headquarters, no Cartesian theatre where 'it all comes together'".

To avoid the perceived shortcomings of Cartesian materialism, Dennett instead proposes the multiple drafts model — a model of consciousness which lacks a central Cartesian theater.

== Replies and objections to Dennett and his arguments ==
=== A philosophy without adherents? ===
Perhaps the primary objection to Dennett's use of the term "Cartesian materialism" is that it is a philosophy without adherents. In this view, Cartesian materialism is essentially a "straw man" — an argument explicitly constructed just so it can be refuted:

The now standard response to Dennett's project is that he has picked a fight with a straw man. Cartesian materialism, it is alleged, is an impossibly naive account of phenomenal consciousness held by no one currently working in cognitive science or the philosophy of mind. Consequently, whatever the effectiveness of Dennett's demolition job, it is fundamentally misdirected (see, e.g., Block, 1993, 1995; Shoemaker, 1993; and Tye, 1993).

It is a point of intense debate as to how many philosophers and scientists even accept Cartesian materialism. On the one hand, some say that this view is "held by no one currently working in cognitive science or the philosophy of mind" or insist that they "know of no one who endorses it." (Michael Tye) On the other hand, some say that Cartesian materialism "informs virtually all research on mind and brain, explicitly and implicitly" (Antonio Damasio) or argue that the common "commitment to qualia or 'phenomenal seemings'" entails an implicit commitment to Cartesian materialism that becomes explicit when they "work out a theory of consciousness in sufficient detail".

Dennett suggests that the Cartesian materialism, though rejected by many philosophers, still colors people's thinking. He writes:

"Perhaps no one today explicitly endorses Cartesian materialism. Many theorists would insist that they have explicitly rejected such an obviously bad idea. But as we shall see, the persuasive imagery of a Cartesian theater keeps coming back to haunt us — laypeople and scientists alike — even after its ghostly dualism has been denounced and exorcised."

=== Replies from dualism ===
Many philosophers question Dennett's immediate rejection of dualism (dismissing it after only a few pages of argument in Consciousness Explained), pointing to a variety of reasons that people often find dualism to be a compelling view (see Arguments for dualism).

To proponents of dualism, mental events have a certain subjective quality to them, whereas physical events obviously do not. That is, for example, what a burned finger feels like, what sky blue looks like, what nice music sounds like, and so on. There is something that it is like to feel pain, to see a familiar shade of blue, and so on; These sensations independent of behavior are known as qualia, and the philosophical problem posed by their alleged existence is called the hard problem of consciousness by David Chalmers.

Dualists argue that Dennett does not explain these phenomena, so much as ignore them. Indeed, the title of Dennett's book Consciousness Explained is often lampooned by critics, who call the book Consciousness Explained Away or even Consciousness Ignored.

=== Replies from Cartesian materialists ===
Some philosophers have actively accepted the moniker of Cartesian materialists, and are not convinced by Dennett's arguments.

O'Brien and Opie (1999) embrace Cartesian materialism, arguing against Dennett's claim that the onset of phenomenal experience in the brain cannot in principle be precisely determined, and offering what they consider to be a way to accommodate the phi phenomenon within the Cartesian materialist paradigm.

Block has described an alternative called "Cartesian Modularism" in which the contents of conscious experience are distributed in the brain.

=== Replies from neuroscience ===
Despite Dennett's insistence that there are no special brain areas that store the contents of consciousness, many neuroscientists reject this assertion. Indeed, what separates conscious information from unconscious information remains a question of interest, and how information from disparate brain regions are assembled into a coherent whole (the binding problem) remains a question which is actively investigated. Recently Global Workspace Theory has argued that perhaps the brain does possess some universally accessible "workspace".

Another criticism comes from investigation into the human visual system. Although both eyes each have a blind spot, conscious visual experience does not subjectively seem to have any holes in it. Some scientists and philosophers had argued, based on subjective reports, that perhaps the brain somehow "fills in" the holes, based upon adjacent visual information. Dennett had powerfully argued that such "filling in" was unnecessary, based on his objections to a Cartesian theater. Ultimately, however, studies have confirmed that the visual cortex does perform a very complex "filling in" process.

The impact of this is itself controversial. Some assume that this is a devastating blow against Dennett, while others have argued that this in no way confirms Cartesian materialism or refutes the multiple drafts model, and that Dennett is fundamentally right even if he's mistaken about this detail.

== See also ==
- Consciousness and mind-body problem
- Dualism, epiphenomenalism, and qualia
- Materialism and eliminative materialism
- Direct realism, indirect realism, and representationalism
