= Seriation =

Seriation is a way of situating an object within a series. It may refer to:

- Seriation (archaeology)
- Seriation (semiotics)
- Seriation (statistics)
