= Multiple drafts model =

Physicalist theory of consciousness based upon cognitivism

Daniel Dennett's multiple drafts model (MDM) of consciousness is a physicalist theory of consciousness based upon cognitivism, which views the mind in terms of information processing. The theory is described in depth in his 1991 book Consciousness Explained. As the title suggests, the book proposes a high-level explanation of consciousness which is consistent with support for the possibility of strong AI.

Dennett describes the theory as first-person operationalism. As he states it:

The Multiple Drafts model makes [the procedure of] "writing it down" in memory criterial for consciousness: that is what it is for the "given" to be "taken" ... There is no reality of conscious experience independent of the effects of various vehicles of content on subsequent action (and hence, of course, on memory).

== Thesis ==
Dennett's thesis is that our modern understanding of consciousness is unduly influenced by the ideas of René Descartes. To show why, he starts with a description of the phi illusion. In this experiment, two different coloured lights, with an angular separation of a few degrees at the eye, are flashed in succession. If the interval between the flashes is less than a second or so, the first light that is flashed appears to move across to the position of the second light. Furthermore, the light seems to change colour as it moves across the visual field. A green light will appear to turn red as it seems to move across to the position of a red light. Dennett asks how we could see the light change colour before the second light is observed.

Dennett claims that conventional explanations of the colour change boil down to either Orwellian or Stalinesque hypotheses, which he says are the result of Descartes's continued influence on our vision of the mind. In an Orwellian hypothesis, the subject comes to one conclusion, then goes back and changes that memory in light of subsequent events. This is akin to George Orwell's Nineteen Eighty-Four, where records of the past are routinely altered. In a Stalinesque hypothesis, the two events would be reconciled prior to entering the subject's consciousness, with the final result presented as fully resolved. This is akin to Joseph Stalin's show trials, where the verdict has been decided in advance and the trial is just a rote presentation.

[W]e can suppose, both theorists have exactly the same theory of what happens in your brain; they agree about just where and when in the brain the mistaken content enters the causal pathways; they just disagree about whether that location is to be deemed pre-experiential or post-experiential. ... [T]hey even agree about how it ought to "feel" to subjects: Subjects should be unable to tell the difference between misbegotten experiences and immediately misremembered experiences. [p. 125, original emphasis.]

Dennett argues that there is no principled basis for picking one of these theories over the other, because they share a common error in supposing that there is a special time and place where unconscious processing becomes consciously experienced, entering into what Dennett calls the "Cartesian theatre". Both theories require us to cleanly divide a sequence of perceptions and reactions into before and after the instant that they reach the seat of consciousness, but he denies that there is any such moment, as it would lead to infinite regress. Instead, he asserts that there is no privileged place in the brain where consciousness happens. Dennett states that, "[t]here does not exist ... a process such as 'recruitment of consciousness' (into what?), nor any place where the 'vehicle's arrival' is recognized (by whom?)"

Cartesian materialism is the view that there is a crucial finish line or boundary somewhere in the brain, marking a place where the order of arrival equals the order of "presentation" in experience because what happens there is what you are conscious of. ... Many theorists would insist that they have explicitly rejected such an obviously bad idea. But ... the persuasive imagery of the Cartesian Theater keeps coming back to haunt us—laypeople and scientists alike—even after its ghostly dualism has been denounced and exorcized. [p. 107, original emphasis.]

With no theatre, there is no screen, hence no reason to re-present data after it has already been analysed. Dennett says that, "the Multiple Drafts model goes on to claim that the brain does not bother 'constructing' any representations that go to the trouble of 'filling in' the blanks. That would be a waste of time and (shall we say?) paint. The judgement is already in so we can get on with other tasks!"

According to the model, there are a variety of sensory inputs from a given event and also a variety of interpretations of these inputs. The sensory inputs arrive in the brain and are interpreted at different times, so a given event can give rise to a succession of discriminations, constituting the equivalent of multiple drafts of a story. As soon as each discrimination is accomplished, it becomes available for eliciting a behaviour; it does not have to wait to be presented at the theatre.

Like a number of other theories, the Multiple Drafts model understands conscious experience as taking time to occur, such that percepts do not instantaneously arise in the mind in their full richness. The distinction is that Dennett's theory denies any clear and unambiguous boundary separating conscious experiences from all other processing. According to Dennett, consciousness is to be found in the actions and flows of information from place to place, rather than some singular view containing our experience. There is no central experiencer who confers a durable stamp of approval on any particular draft.

Different parts of the neural processing assert more or less control at different times. For something to reach consciousness is akin to becoming famous, in that it must leave behind consequences by which it is remembered. To put it another way, consciousness is the property of having enough influence to affect what the mouth will say and the hands will do. Which inputs are "edited" into our drafts is not an exogenous act of supervision, but part of the self-organizing functioning of the network, and at the same level as the circuitry that conveys information bottom-up.

The conscious self is taken to exist as an abstraction visible at the level of the intentional stance, akin to a body of mass having a "centre of gravity". Analogously, Dennett refers to the self as the "centre of narrative gravity", a story we tell ourselves about our experiences. Consciousness exists, but not independently of behaviour and behavioural disposition, which can be studied through heterophenomenology.

The origin of this operationalist approach can be found in Dennett's immediately preceding work. Dennett (1988) explains consciousness in terms of access consciousness alone, denying the independent existence of what Ned Block has labeled phenomenal consciousness. He argues that "Everything real has properties, and since I don't deny the reality of conscious experience, I grant that conscious experience has properties". Having related all consciousness to properties, he concludes that they cannot be meaningfully distinguished from our judgements about them. He writes:

The infallibilist line on qualia treats them as properties of one's experience one cannot in principle misdiscover, and this is a mysterious doctrine (at least as mysterious as papal infallibility) unless we shift the emphasis a little and treat qualia as logical constructs out of subjects' qualia-judgments: a subject's experience has the quale F if and only if the subject judges his experience to have quale F. We can then treat such judgings as constitutive acts, in effect, bringing the quale into existence by the same sort of license as novelists have to determine the hair color of their characters by fiat. We do not ask how Dostoevski knows that Raskolnikov's hair is light brown.

In other words, once we've explained a perception fully in terms of how it affects us, there is nothing left to explain. In particular, there is no such thing as a perception which may be considered in and of itself (a quale). Instead, the subject's honest reports of how things seem to them are inherently authoritative on how things seem to them, but not on the matter of how things actually are.

So when we look one last time at our original characterization of qualia, as ineffable, intrinsic, private, directly apprehensible properties of experience, we find that there is nothing to fill the bill. In their place are relatively or practically ineffable public properties we can refer to indirectly via reference to our private property-detectors—private only in the sense of idiosyncratic. And insofar as we wish to cling to our subjective authority about the occurrence within us of states of certain types or with certain properties, we can have some authority—not infallibility or incorrigibility, but something better than sheer guessing—but only if we restrict ourselves to relational, extrinsic properties like the power of certain internal states of ours to provoke acts of apparent re-identification. So contrary to what seems obvious at first blush, there simply are no qualia at all.

The key to the multiple drafts model is that, after removing qualia, explaining consciousness boils down to explaining the behaviour we recognise as conscious. Consciousness is as consciousness does.

== Critical responses ==
Psychobiologist John Staddon contrasts a simple "new behaviorism" interpretation of color phi with Dennett and Kinsbourne's account. The basic idea is that because of well-known processes such as lateral inhibition, the internal states created by the two stimuli are identical, hence are so reported. Bogen (1992) points out that the brain is bilaterally symmetrical. That being the case, if Cartesian materialism is true, there might be two Cartesian theatres, so arguments against only one are flawed. Velmans (1992) argues that the phi effect and the cutaneous rabbit illusion demonstrate that there is a delay whilst modelling occurs and that this delay was discovered by Benjamin Libet.

It has also been claimed that the argument in the multiple drafts model does not support its conclusion.

=== "Straw man" ===
Much of the criticism asserts that Dennett's theory attacks the wrong target, failing to explain what it claims to. Chalmers (1996) maintains that Dennett has produced no more than a theory of how subjects report events. Some even parody the title of the book as "Consciousness Explained Away", accusing him of greedy reductionism. Another line of criticism disputes the accuracy of Dennett's characterisations of existing theories:

The now standard response to Dennett's project is that he has picked a fight with a straw man. Cartesian materialism, it is alleged, is an impossibly naive account of phenomenal consciousness held by no one currently working in cognitive science or the philosophy of mind. Consequently, whatever the effectiveness of Dennett's demolition job, it is fundamentally misdirected (see, e.g., Block, 1993, 1995; Shoemaker, 1993; and Tye, 1993).

=== Unoriginality ===
Multiple drafts is also attacked for making a claim to novelty. It may be the case, however, that such attacks mistake which features Dennett is claiming as novel. Korb states that, "I believe that the central thesis will be relatively uncontentious for most cognitive scientists, but that its use as a cleaning solvent for messy puzzles will be viewed less happily in most quarters." (Korb 1993) In this way, Dennett uses uncontroversial ideas towards more controversial ends, leaving him open to claims of unoriginality when uncontroversial parts are focused upon.

Even the notion of consciousness as drafts is not unique to Dennett. According to Hankins, Dieter Teichert suggests that Paul Ricoeur's theories agree with Dennett's on the notion that "the self is basically a narrative entity, and that any attempt to give it a free-floating independent status is misguided." [Hankins] Others see Derrida's (1982) representationalism as consistent with the notion of a mind that has perceptually changing content without a definitive present instant.

To those who believe that consciousness entails something more than behaving in all ways conscious, Dennett's view is seen as eliminativist, since it denies the existence of qualia and the possibility of philosophical zombies. However, Dennett is not denying the existence of the mind or of consciousness, only what he considers a naive view of them. The point of contention is whether Dennett's own definitions are indeed more accurate: whether what we think of when we speak of perceptions and consciousness can be understood in terms of nothing more than their effect on behaviour.

=== Information processing and consciousness ===
The role of information processing in consciousness has been criticised by John Searle who, in his Chinese room argument, states that he cannot find anything that could be recognised as conscious experience in a system that relies solely on motions of things from place to place. Dennett sees this argument as misleading, arguing that consciousness is not to be found in a specific part of the system, but in the actions of the whole. In essence, he denies that consciousness requires something in addition to capacity for behaviour, saying that philosophers such as Searle, "just can't imagine how understanding could be a property that emerges from lots of distributed quasi-understanding in a large system".

== See also ==
- Artificial consciousness
- Cognitive model
- Conceptual space
- Global Workspace Theory
- Image schema

== Bibliography ==
- Dennett, Daniel C. (1988) [November 1978]. "Quining qualia". In Marcel, Anthony J.; Bisiach, Edoardo (eds.). Consciousness in contemporary science. Oxford Science Publications. Oxford, UK: Clarendon Press. ISBN 978-0-19-852168-6. Archived from the original on 17 August 2000. Reprinted in Marcel, Anthony J.; Bisiach, Edoardo, eds. (12 March 1992). Consciousness in contemporary science (Paperback with corrections ed.). pp. 42–77. doi:10.1093/acprof:oso/9780198522379.003.0003.; Lycan, W., ed. (1990). Mind and Cognition: A Reader. MIT Press. pp. 519–548.; Goldman, A., ed. (1993). Readings in Philosophy and Cognitive Science. MIT Press. pp. 381–414.
