= Color phi phenomenon =

Optical illusion

The color phi phenomenon is the fact that, when apparent motion is induced between objects with different colors, the color of the apparently moving object abruptly changes midway along the path. It is a perceptual illusion described by psychologists Paul Kolers and Michael von Grünau in which a disembodied perception of motion is produced by a succession of still images. The color phi phenomenon is a more complex variation of the phi phenomenon. Kolers and von Grünau originally investigated the phenomenon in response to a question posed by the philosopher Nelson Goodman, who asked what the effect of the color change would have on the phi phenomenon.

The classic color phi phenomenon experiment involves a viewer or audience watching a screen, upon which the experimenter projects two images in succession. The first image depicts a blue dot at the top of the frame. The second image depicts a red dot on the bottom of the frame. The images may be shown quickly, in rapid succession, or each frame may be given several seconds of viewing time. Once both images have been projected, the experimenter asks the viewer or audience to describe what they saw.

At certain combinations of spacing and timing of the two images, a viewer will report a sensation of motion in the space between the two dots. The first spot will begin to appear to be moving, and will then "change color abruptly in the middle of its illusory path".

What is actually shown: First a blue dot is shown at the top of the screen, followed by a period of blank screen. Finally a red dot is shown at the bottom of the screen.

Subjects report seeing a dot that moves from the top to the bottom. The dot changes color midway through its path.

== Philosophical significance ==
The existence of the color phi phenomenon poses an interesting philosophical problem. When asked to describe their experience, subjects report seeing the abrupt color change before the second dot is presented. However, it is impossible for a subject to actually experience the color change before the second dot has been presented.

Philosopher Daniel Dennett utilizes the color phi phenomenon in his argument against a philosophy known as Cartesian materialism. Psychobiologist John Staddon contrasts a simple "new behaviorism" interpretation of color phi with Dennett and Kinsbourne's account. The basic idea is that because of well-known processes such as lateral inhibition, the internal states created by the two stimuli are identical, hence are so reported. Alternatively, phi can be explained without Dennett's argument.

== See also ==
- Lilac chaser
- Optical illusion
- Persistence of vision
- Phi phenomenon
