= Brainstorm =

Brainstorm may refer to:

== Film ==
- Brainstorm (1965 film), directed by William Conrad
- Brainstorm (1983 film), directed by Douglas Trumbull
- Brainstorm (2000 film), Brazilian film directed by Laís Bodanzky, also known as Bicho de Sete Cabeças
- Brainstorm, alternate title of the 2002 movie Cypher

== Music ==
=== Artists ===
- Brainstorm (Latvian band), a pop/rock band
- Brainstorm (German band), a power metal band
- Brainstorm (American band), a funk and R&B band
- Brainstorm, a rapper with Brothers Grym
- Brainstorm, one of the pseudonyms used by the musician Moby

=== Albums ===
- Brainstorm (album), a 1991 album by rapper Young MC
- Brainstorm (EP), the first extended play by Disney star Mitchel Musso
- Brainstorm, a 1976 album by the Osmonds

=== Songs ===
- "Brainstorm", a song by Hawkwind from their 1972 album Doremi Fasol Latido
- "Brainstorm", a song by Kevin Ayers from his 2007 album The Unfairground
- "Brainstorm", a song by Morbid Angel from their 1991 album Blessed Are the Sick
- "Brainstorming / Kimi Sae Ireba Nani mo Iranai", a song by the Japanese female idol group Morning Musume

== Fictional characters ==
- Brainstorm (Transformers), an Autobot Headmaster in the Transformers fiction
- Brainstorm (Ben 10), an alien in the Ben 10 animated television series
- Brain Storm (character), a villain from DC Comics
- Valeria Richards, a young hero in the Marvel Comics series The Fantastic Four

== Other uses ==
- Brainstorming, a group or individual creativity exercise
- Brainstorm (magazine), a trade publication for the South African technology sector
- Brainstorm, a defunct division of Interplay Entertainment that focused on educational software for children

== See also ==
- Brainstorms, a 1981 book by Daniel Dennett
- "Brianstorm", a 2007 single by Arctic Monkeys
- Professor Branestawm, a character in the novels of Norman Hunter
