= From Bacteria to Bach and Back =

2017 book by Daniel Dennett

From Bacteria to Bach and Back: The Evolution of Minds
- Cover (Painting by Vasily Kandinsky, "transverse line" 1923)
- Author: Daniel Dennett
- Language: English
- Subject: Human consciousness
- Published: 2017
- Publisher: W. W. Norton & Company
- Media type: Print (hardcover)
- Pages: 496
- ISBN: 978-0-393-24207-2

From Bacteria to Bach and Back: The Evolution of Minds is a 2017 book about the origin of human consciousness by the philosopher Daniel Dennett, in which the author makes a case for a materialist theory of mind, arguing that consciousness is no more mysterious than gravity.

Drawing on ideas from René Descartes and Charles Darwin, Dennett writes that:

'... natural systems can create "competence without comprehension"—that is, situations in which sophisticated actions occur without the individual or machine involved understanding the reasons for the actions taken.'

and that:

'a comprehending mind could in fact have arisen from a mindless process of natural selection. ...'

== Critical reception ==
Physician Harriet Hall reviewing the book for Skeptical Inquirer magazine, said that "Dennett is always worth reading, and this latest book distills his current thinking and all he has learned over the years". He discusses many "conundrums with facts and arguments from evolution and neuroscience". "Dennett warns that trying to understand consciousness, 'We mustn't let our moral intuitions distort our empirical investigation from the outset'". Hall suggests that this book is not for light reading, but well written, something you will need to think about as you ponder "how consciousness works and how it came about".

== See also ==
- Materialism
- Theory of mind
