= Brainstorm machine =

Thought experiment in the philosophy of mind

In the philosophy of mind, the Brainstorm machine is a thought experiment described by Daniel Dennett, to show that it is not possible to intersubjectively compare any two individuals' personal experiences, or qualia, even with perfect technology. It is based on a device described in the film Brainstorm, in which the visual experience of one individual is fed into the brain of another. According to Dennett in Quining Qualia:

Suppose [that] there were some neuroscientific apparatus that fits on your head and feeds your visual experience into my brain. With eyes closed I accurately report everything you are looking at, except that I marvel at how the sky is yellow, the grass red, and so forth. Would this not confirm, empirically, that our qualia were different? But suppose the technician then pulls the plug on the connecting cable, inverts it 180 degrees and reinserts it in the socket. Now I report the sky is blue, the grass green, and so forth. Which is the "right" orientation of the plug? Designing and building such a device would require that its "fidelity" be tuned or calibrated by the normalization of the two subjects' reports--so we would be right back at our evidential starting point. The moral of this intuition pump is that no intersubjective comparison of qualia is possible, even with perfect technology.

— Daniel Dennett, Quining Qualia
