= Michael von Grünau =

Canadian psychologist (1944–2011)

- Born: Michel Werner von Grünau; 3 October 1944; Bayrischzell, Germany
- Died: 22 December 2011 (aged 67); Montreal, Quebec, Canada
- Scientific career
- Fields: Psychology, neuropsychology
- Workplaces: Concordia University

Michael Werner von Grünau (October 3, 1944 – December 22, 2011) was a Canadian psychologist and neurophysiologist at Concordia University.

== Early life and education ==
von Grünau was born in Germany, the son of Viktoria Hanke and Werner von Grünau. His father was a translator and a writer; his mother was a housewife and a writing assistant for her husband.

von Grünau grew up in West Germany, but emigrated to Canada in about 1965 to study physics at University of Toronto. He graduated in 1968, but then commenced a MA in psychology, graduating in 1971, and a PhD, graduating in 1975. His PhD was supervised by Paul Kolers.

== Career ==
In the early 1980s von Grünau moved to the Department of Psychology at Queen's University at Kingston, where he founded a neurophysiology laboratory to study the visual system of cats. He continued his psychophysical studies of human visual perception.

In about 1987, von Grünau spent about 18 months as a postdoctoral fellow at the National Research Council (Canada) in the Division of Physics, under the supervision of Bill Cowan. He worked mainly with Patrick Cavanagh.

In 1989, von Grünau moved to the Department of Psychology at Concordia University in Montreal, where he worked until his death in 2011.

== Research ==
Around 1975, von Grünau conducted research into the color phi phenomenon, investigating the influence of color on apparent movement from stationary images, and also into the fluttering heart phenomenon in which a red patch on a blue background appears to jump around as an observer moves his or her eyes.

In the early 1980s von Grünau conducted neurophysiology studies on the visual system of cats, including on the plasticity of their binocular vision. He also continued his psychophysical studies of human visual perception.

After 1989, von Grünau worked mainly in the psychophysics of human visual perception, on phenomena surrounding higher-order motion aftereffects, visual search and attention in the real world, visual flow fields, and eye movements.

== Personal life ==
In 1991, von Grünau married Marinez de Andrade. They adopted a son, Fernando in 1999, from Brazil, and a daughter, Gabriela, in 2002, from China.

von Grünau died on 22 December 2011, from cancer.

== Works ==
- Kolers, P., & von Grunau, M. (1976). Shape and color in apparent motion. Vision Research. 16, 329–335.
- von Grünau, M. W. (1975). The "fluttering heart" and spatio-temporal characteristics of color processing—I: Reversibility and the influence of luminance. Vision Research, 15, 431–436. doi:10.1016/0042-6989(75)90094-2
- von Grunau, M.W. (1982). Comparison of the effects of induced strabismus on binocularity in area 17 and the LS area in the cat. Brain Research, 246(2), 325-329.
- Dodwell, P.C., Wilkinson, F.E., & von Grünau, M.W. (1983). Pattern recognition in kittens: Performance on Lie patterns. Perception, 12(4), 393-410.
- Von Grünau, M.W. (1984). Long-term changes of orienting behavior in cats with artificial divergent strabismus. Behavioural brain research, 13(2), 139-153.
- von Grünau, M.W., Zumbroich, T.J., & Poulin C. (1987). Visual receptive field properties in the posterior suprasylvian cortex of the cat: A comparison between the areas PMLS and PLLS. Vision Research, 27(3), 343-356.
- Von Grünau, M., & Anston, C. (1995) The detection of gaze direction: A stare-in-the-crowd effect. Perception, 24, 1297–1313.
- Galera C., Lopes E.J., & von Grünau M.W. (2000). Stimulus segmentation in the visual search task. Perception & Psychophysics, 62, 505–516.
- Haghighat F., Sakr W., Gunnarsen L., & von Grünau M.W. (2001). The impact of combinations of building materials and intermittent ventilation on perceived air quality. ASHRAE Transactions107, Part 1, 1–15.
- Iordanova M. & von Grünau M.W. (2001). Asymmetrical masking between radial and parallel motion flow in transparent displays. In: Progress in Brain Research, special edition: From Neurons to Cognition, 134, 333–352.
- von Grünau M.W. (2002). Bivectorial transparent stimuli simultaneously adapt mechanisms at different levels of the motion pathway. Vision Research, 42, 577–587.
- von Grünau M.W., Panagopoulos A., Galera C., & Savina O. (2002). Visual search with exogenous and endogenous cueing. Proceedings of the International Psychophysical Society, 18, 225–230.
- von Grünau M.W. & Iordanova M. (2004). A visual mechanism for extraction of heading information in complex flow fields. In: Vaina L.M., Beardsley S.A. & Rushton S. (Eds.) Optic Flow and Beyond. Kluwer Academic Publishers, Netherlands, Ch. 3, pp 45–59.
- Panagopoulos A., von Grünau M.W., & Galera C. (2004). Attentive mechanisms in visual search. Spatial Vision, 17, 353–371.
- Galera C., von Grünau M.W., & Panagopoulos A. (2004). Size and shape of the attentional spotlight affect efficiency of processing. In: Oliveira, A.M., Teixeira, M.P., Borges, G.F., & Ferro, M.J. (Eds). Fechner Day 2004, Proceedings of the International Psychophysical Society, 20, 368–373.
- Cavanagh, P., von Grünau, M., & Zimmerman, L. (2004). View dependence of 3D recovery from folded pictures and warped 3D faces. IEEE Proceedings of the Second International Symposium on 3D Data Processing, Visualization, and Transmission, 35–41.
- Lacroix G., Constantinescu I., Cousineau D., de Almeida R., Segalowitz N., & von Grünau M.W. (2005). Attentional blink differences between adolescent dyslexic and normal readers. Brain & Cognition, 57, 115–119.
- Galera C., von Grünau M.W., & Panagopoulos A. (2005). Automatic focusing of attention on object size and shape. Psychológica, 26, 147–160.
- Lacroix, G. L., Segalowitz, N., von Grünau, M., Gurnsey, R., de Almeida, R. G., Borokhovski, E., Wada, N., & Constantinescu, I. (2005). Sciences cognitives appliquées et habiletés langagières de base. In S. Pierre (ed.) Innovations et tendances en technologies de formation et d‚apprentissage (pp. 521–540). Montreal, Quebec : Presses Internationales Polytechnique.
- Galera C., Cavallet M., von Grünau M., & Panagopoulos A. (2006). Attentive characteristics revealed by local and global multiple cues. Psicologia: Teoria e Pesquisa, 22, 327–334.
- Vavassis A. & von Grünau M.W. (2007). Complex backgrounds delay low-load visual search. Spatial Vision. 20, 467–488.
- von Grünau M.W., Pilgrim K., & Zhou R. (2007). Velocity discrimination thresholds for flowfield motions with moving observers. Vision Research, 47, 2453–2464.
- Zhou R., Johnson A., Gurnsey R., & von Grünau M.W. (2008). Visual performance in normal and simulated low vision. Proceedings of the 9th International Conference on Low Vision, Montreal, July, 2008.
