= Cartesian theater =

Philosophical term

Objects experienced are represented to a homonculus within the mind of the observer

The "Cartesian theater" is a term coined by philosopher and cognitive scientist Daniel Dennett to critique a persistent flaw in theories of mind, introduced in his 1991 book Consciousness Explained.

It mockingly describes the idea of consciousness as a centralized "stage" in the brain where perceptions are presented to an internal observer. Dennett ties this to Cartesian materialism, which he considers to be the often unacknowledged residue of René Descartes's dualism in modern materialist views. This model implies an infinite regress, as each observer would require another to perceive it, a problem Dennett argues misrepresents how consciousness actually emerges.

The phrase echoes earlier skepticism from Dennett's teacher, Gilbert Ryle, who, in The Concept of Mind (1949), similarly derided Cartesian dualism's depiction of the mind as a "private theater" or "second theater".

== Overview ==
Descartes originally claimed that consciousness requires an immaterial soul, which interacts with the body via the pineal gland of the brain. Dennett says that, when the dualism is removed, what remains of Descartes's original model amounts to imagining a tiny theater in the brain where a homunculus (small person), now physical, performs the task of observing all the sensory data projected on a screen at a particular instant, making the decisions and sending out commands.

The term "Cartesian theater" was brought up in the context of the multiple drafts model that Dennett posits in Consciousness Explained (1991):

Cartesian materialism is the view that there is a crucial finish line or boundary somewhere in the brain, marking a place where the order of arrival equals the order of "presentation" in experience because what happens there is what you are conscious of. […] Many theorists would insist that they have explicitly rejected such an obviously bad idea. But […] the persuasive imagery of the Cartesian Theater keeps coming back to haunt us—laypeople and scientists alike—even after its ghostly dualism has been denounced and exorcized.

== Descartes's views ==
Philosopher Peter Slezak argued that Descartes himself rejected the idea of Cartesian theater, citing his works La Dioptrique and Meditations on First Philosophy. In the former, Descartes writes: "I am not merely present in my body as a sailor is present in a ship, but that I am very closely joined and, as it were intermingled with it, so that I and the body form a unit." In Meditations, responding to an objection raised by Antoine Arnauld, Descartes writes: "I thought I took sufficient care to prevent anyone inferring that man was simply a spirit that makes use of a body."

== See also ==
- Circular reasoning
- Global workspace theory
- Inside Out
- Münchhausen trilemma
- The Numskulls
- Personal horizon
- Purusha
- Turtles all the way down
- Homunculus argument
- Vertiginous question
