= Heterophenomenology =

Third-person approach to studying consciousness

In the thought of the philosopher Daniel Dennett, heterophenomenology ("phenomenology of another, not oneself") is an explicitly third-person, scientific approach to the study of consciousness and other mental phenomena. It consists of applying the scientific method with an anthropological bent, combining the subject's self-reports with all other available evidence to determine their mental state. The goal is to discover how subjects see the world themselves, without taking the accuracy of the subject's view for granted.

== Overview ==
Heterophenomenology is put forth as the alternative to traditional Cartesian phenomenology, which Dennett calls "lone-wolf autophenomenology" to emphasize the fact that traditional phenomenology accepts the subject's self-reports as being authoritative. In contrast, heterophenomenology considers the subjects authoritative only about how things seem to them. It does not dismiss the Cartesian first-person perspective, but rather brackets it so that it can be intersubjectively verified by empirical means, allowing it to be submitted as scientific evidence.

The method requires a researcher to listen to the subjects and take what they say seriously, but to also look at everything else available to them, including the subject's bodily responses and environment, evidence provided by relevant neurological or psychological studies, the researcher's memories of their own experiences, and any other scientific data that might help to interpret what the subject has reported.

Dennett notes this method is actually the normal way that anyone will choose to investigate aspects of the mind. He writes: "heterophenomenology is nothing new; it is nothing other than the method that has been used by psychophysicists, cognitive psychologists, clinical neuropsychologists, and just about everybody who has ever purported to study human consciousness in a serious, scientific way".

The key role of heterophenomenology in Dennett's philosophy of consciousness is that it defines all that can or needs to be known about the mind. For any phenomenological question "why do I experience X", there is a corresponding heterophenomenological question "why does the subject say 'I experience X'". To quote Dennett, "The total set of details of heterophenomenology, plus all the data we can gather about concurrent events in the brains of subjects and in the surrounding environment, comprise the total data set for a theory of human consciousness. It leaves out no objective phenomena and no subjective phenomena of consciousness."

== See also ==
- Alterity
- Cartesian theater
- Consciousness
- Genetic psychology (Brentano)
- Metaphysics of presence
- Neurology
- Noumenon
- Phenomena
- Phenomenology (philosophy)
- Phenomenology (psychology)
- Qualia
- Theory-ladenness
