= Bernard Baars =

Dutch neurobiologist (born 1946)

Bernard J. Baars also known as Bernie Baars (born 1946, Amsterdam, Netherlands) is a cognitive neuroscientist, best known as the originator of global workspace theory (GWT), a concept of human cognitive architecture and consciousness.

== Life and work ==
Baars was born in Amsterdam, The Netherlands, and moved to California with his family in 1958, aged around 12.

Before moving into consciousness studies he trained as a language psychologist. He served as a professor of psychology at Stony Brook University, where he conducted research into the causation of human errors and the Freudian slip, and as a faculty member at the Wright Institute. He was a senior fellow in theoretical neurobiology at the former Neurosciences Institute in San Diego, California. Baars co-founded the Association for the Scientific Study of Consciousness and the Academic Press journal Consciousness and Cognition, which he also edited, with William P. Banks, for "more than fifteen years".

In addition to research on global workspace theory with Stan Franklin and others, Baars has done work to reintroduce the topic of the conscious brain into the standard college and graduate school curriculum, by writing college textbooks and general-audience books, web teaching, advanced seminars, and course videos.

== Bibliography ==
- A Cognitive Theory of Consciousness, NY: Cambridge University Press 1988, ISBN 0-521-30133-5.
- Cognition, Brain and Consciousness: An Introduction to Cognitive Neuroscience. (Second edition). London: Elsevier/Academic Press, 2010, with Nicole M. Gage, ISBN 978-0-12-375070-9
- The Cognitive Revolution in Psychology, NY: Guilford Press, 1986, ISBN 0-89862-912-8.
- The Experimental Psychology of Human Error: Implications for the Architecture of Voluntary Control, NY: Plenum Press, Series on Cognition and Language, 1992, ISBN 0-306-43866-6
- In the Theater of Consciousness: The Workspace of the Mind, NY: Oxford University Press, 1997, ISBN 0-19-514703-0.
