= Global workspace theory =

Model of consciousness

Global workspace theory (GWT) is a cognitive architecture and theoretical framework for understanding consciousness and was first introduced in 1988 by cognitive scientist Bernard Baars. It was developed to qualitatively explain a large set of matched pairs of conscious and unconscious processes. GWT has been influential in modeling consciousness and higher-order cognition as emerging from competition and integrated flows of information across widespread, parallel neural processes.

Bernard Baars derived inspiration for the theory as the cognitive analog of the blackboard system of early artificial intelligence system architectures, where independent programs shared information.

Global workspace theory is one of the leading models of consciousness.

== Theater metaphor ==
GWT uses the metaphor of a theater, with conscious thought being like material illuminated on the main stage. Attention acts as a spotlight, bringing some of this unconscious activity into conscious awareness on the global workspace. Baars wrote in his 1997 article "In the Theatre of Consciousness" in the Journal of Consciousness Studies that the concept describes:

[A] stage, an attentional spotlight shining on the stage, actors to represent the contents of conscious experience, an audience, and a few invisible people behind the scenes, who exercise great influence on whatever becomes visible on stage.

The stage receives sensory and abstract information, but only events in the spotlight shining on the stage are completely conscious.

A review of Baars' 1997 book In the Theater of Consciousness: The Workspace of the Mind further described:

Thus peripheral and central sensory stimuli, imagination, and intuition compete for the center of attention, from where they address the unconscious processes of memory, interpretation, automatic routines, and motivation which, in turn, affect the control and context operators running the show from behind the scenes.

In a discussion with Susan Blackmore in her book Conversations on Consciousness, Baars said:

From my point of view, the metaphor that is useful for understanding consciousness is the theatre metaphor, which also happens to be quite ancient, going back at least to Plato in the West, and to the Vedanta scriptures in the East. The theatre metaphor, in a simple way, says that what's conscious is like the bright spot cast by a spotlight on to the stage of a theatre. What's unconscious is everything else: all the people sitting in the audience are unconscious components of the brain which get information from consciousness; and there are people sitting behind the scenes, the director and the playwright and so on, who are shaping the contents of consciousness, telling the actor in the light spot what to say. It's a very simple metaphor, but it turns out to be quite useful.

Baars distinguishes this from Cartesian theater: "You don't have a little self sitting in the theatre".

== The model ==
The brain contains many specialized processes or modules that operate in parallel, much of which is unconscious. The global workspace is a functional hub of broadcast and integration that allows information to be disseminated across modules. As such GWT can be classified as a functionalist theory of consciousness.

When sensory input, memories, or internal representations receive attention, they enter the global workspace and become accessible to various cognitive processes. As elements compete for attention, those that succeed gain entry to the global workspace, allowing their information to be distributed and coordinated throughout the whole cognitive system.

GWT resembles the concept of working memory and is proposed to correspond to a 'momentarily active, subjectively experienced' event in working memory. It facilitates top-down control of attention, working memory, planning, and problem-solving through this information sharing.

GWT involves a fleeting memory with a duration of a few seconds (much shorter than the 10–30 seconds of classical working memory). GWT contents are proposed to correspond to what we are conscious of, and are broadcast to a multitude of unconscious cognitive brain processes, which may be called receiving processes. Other unconscious processes, operating in parallel with limited communication between them, can form coalitions which can act as input processes to the global workspace. Since globally broadcast messages can evoke actions in receiving processes throughout the brain, the global workspace may be used to exercise executive control to perform voluntary actions. Individual as well as allied processes compete for access to the global workspace, striving to disseminate their messages to all other processes in an effort to recruit more cohorts and thereby increase the likelihood of achieving their goals. Incoming stimuli need to be stored temporarily in order to be able to compete for attention and conscious access. Kouider and Dehaene predicted the existence of a sensory memory buffer that maintains stimuli for "a few hundreds of milliseconds". Recent research offers preliminary evidence for such a buffer store and indicates a gradual but rapid decay with extraction of meaningful information severely impaired after 300 ms and most data being completely lost after 700 ms.

Baars asserts that working memory "is closely associated with conscious experience, though not identical to it." Conscious events may involve more necessary conditions, such as interacting with a "self" system, and an executive interpreter in the brain, such as has been suggested by a number of authors including Michael S. Gazzaniga.

Nevertheless, GWT can successfully model a number of characteristics of consciousness, such as its role in handling novel situations, its limited capacity, its sequential nature, and its ability to trigger a vast range of unconscious brain processes. Moreover, GWT lends itself well to computational modeling. Stan Franklin's IDA model is one such computational implementation of GWT. See also Dehaene et al. (2003), Shanahan and Bao's "Global Workspace Network" model.

GWT also specifies "behind the scenes" contextual systems, which shape conscious contents without ever becoming conscious, such as the dorsal cortical stream of the visual system. This architectural approach leads to specific neural hypotheses. Sensory events in different modalities may compete with each other for consciousness if their contents are incompatible. For example, the audio and video track of a movie will compete rather than fuse if the two tracks are out of sync by more than 100 ms., approximately. The 100 ms time domain corresponds closely with the known brain physiology of consciousness, including brain rhythms in the alpha-theta-gamma domain, and event-related potentials in the 200–300 ms domain.

However, much of this research is based on studies of unconscious priming and recent studies show that many of the methods used for unconscious priming are flawed.

== Global neuronal workspace ==
Stanislas Dehaene extended the global workspace with the "neuronal avalanche" showing how sensory information gets selected to be broadcast throughout the cortex. Many brain regions, the prefrontal cortex, anterior temporal lobe, inferior parietal lobe, and the precuneus all send and receive numerous projections to and from a broad variety of distant brain regions, allowing the neurons there to integrate information over space and time. Multiple sensory modules can therefore converge onto a single coherent interpretation, for example, a "red sports car zooming by". This global interpretation is broadcast back to the global workspace creating the conditions for the emergence of a single state of consciousness, at once differentiated and integrated.

Alternatively, the theory of practopoiesis suggests that the global workspace is achieved in the brain primarily through fast adaptive mechanisms of nerve cells. According to that theory, connectivity does not matter much. Rather, what is critical is the fact that neurons can rapidly adapt to the sensory context within which they operate. Notably, for achieving a global workspace, the theory presumes that these fast adaptive mechanisms have the capability to learn when and how to adapt.

== Criticism ==
J. W. Dalton has criticized the global workspace theory on the grounds that it provides, at best, an account of the cognitive function of consciousness, and fails even to address the deeper problem of its nature, of what consciousness is, and of how any mental process whatsoever can be conscious: the hard problem of consciousness. However, the abstract of Avshalom Elitzur's 1997 paper summarized that while GWT "does not address the 'hard problems,' namely, the very nature of consciousness, it constrains any theory that attempts to do so and provides important insights into the relation between consciousness and cognition".

In Consciousness: A Very Short Introduction, Susan Blackmore said there are two possible interpretations of GWT and it is often hard to tell which people mean, but "in the first version, the hard problem remains: something magical happens to turn unconscious items into conscious ones. In the second, it disappears, but we have to give up the idea that some items are conscious and others not".

== See also ==
- Artificial consciousness
- Cognitive map
- Cognitive model
- Conceptual space
- Image schema
- LIDA (cognitive architecture)
- Multiple drafts model of consciousness
- Neural correlates of consciousness
- Sparse distributed memory
