= Brainstorms =

1978 book by American philosopher Daniel Dennett

Brainstorms: Philosophical Essays on Mind and Psychology
- Author: Daniel C. Dennett
- Language: English
- Subjects: Artificial intelligence; Consciousness
- Published: 1978 (Bradford Books); 1981 (MIT Press)
- Publication place: United States
- ISBN: 9780897060011

Brainstorms: Philosophical Essays on Mind and Psychology is a 1978 book by American philosopher Daniel Dennett. The book is a collection of seventeen essays in which Dennett reflects on the early achievements of artificial intelligence to develop his ideas on consciousness, theory of mind, and free will.

== Reception ==
Douglas Hofstadter, writing in the New York Review of Books, praised Brainstorms, calling it "one of the most important contributions to thinking about thinking yet written". John Haugeland reviewed Brainstorms for the journal Philosophy of Science where he called it "philosophically important and delightfully written", though he criticised Dennett's arguments about morality. Gilbert Harman, writing in The Philosophical Review, called Brainstorms "brilliant". Robert Cummins wrote in Philosophical Topics that Brainstorms is "important and good" and called it "the most entertaining bit of non-fiction I've read in a long while".
