= Giorgio Buttazzo =

Italian computer scientist (1960-)

Giorgio Buttazzo from the Sant'Anna School of Advanced Studies, Pisa, Italy was named Fellow of the Institute of Electrical and Electronics Engineers (IEEE) in 2012 for contributions to dynamic scheduling algorithms in real-time systems.
