= Daniel Dennett =

American philosopher (1942–2024)

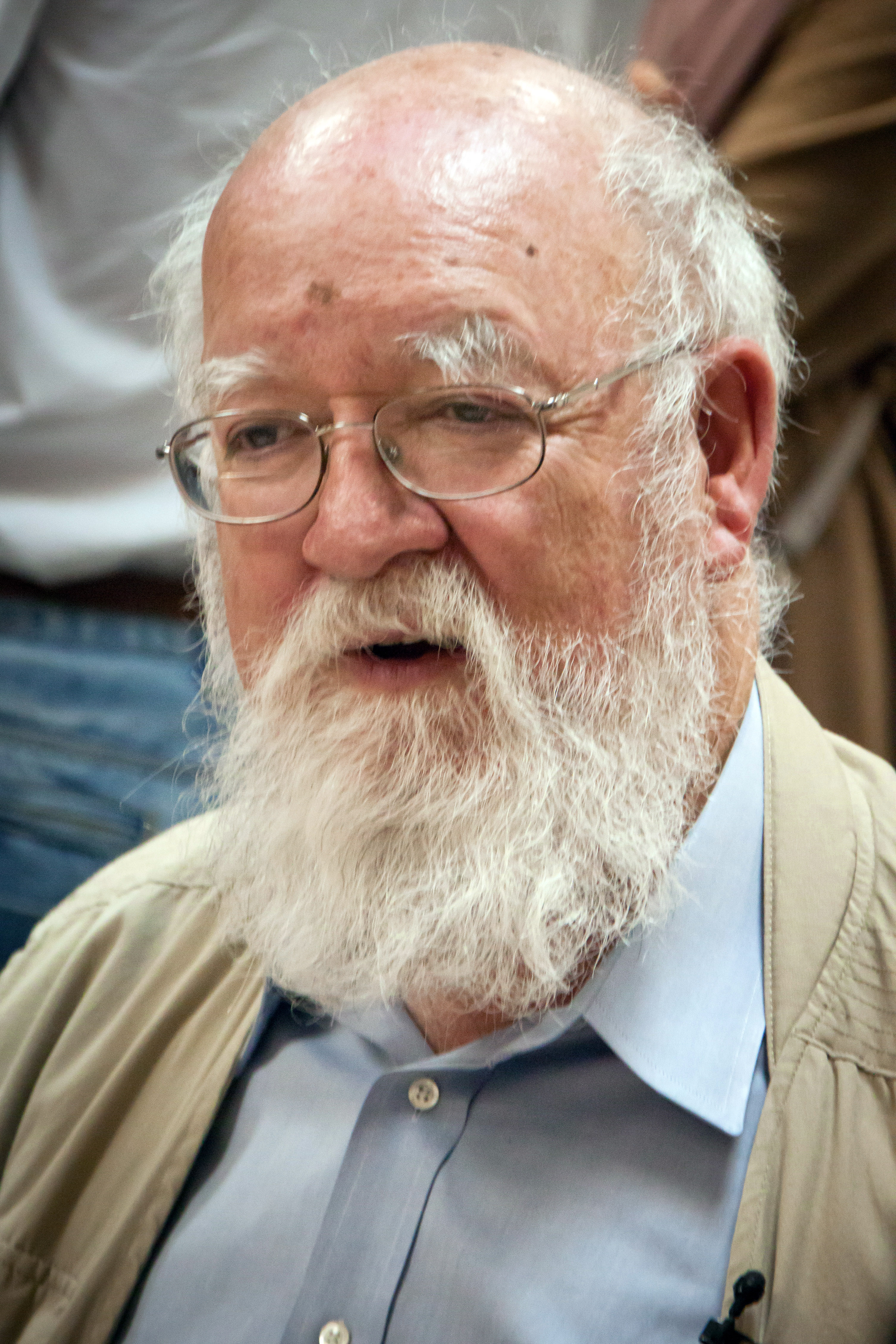
- Dennett in 2012
- Born: Daniel Clement Dennett III; March 28, 1942; Boston, Massachusetts, U.S.
- Died: April 19, 2024 (aged 82); Portland, Maine, U.S.
- Spouse: Susan Bell (m. 1962)
- Awards: Jean Nicod Prize (2001); Mind & Brain Prize (2011); Erasmus Prize (2012)

Education
- Education: Harvard University (BA); Hertford College, Oxford (DPhil)
- Thesis: The Mind and the Brain (1965)
- Doctoral advisor: Gilbert Ryle
- Other advisor: Willard Van Orman Quine

Philosophical work
- Era: Contemporary philosophy
- Region: Western philosophy
- School: Analytic philosophy; New Atheism; Materialism
- Institutions: Tufts University
- Main interests: Philosophy of mind; cognitive science; free will; philosophy of religion
- Notable works: Consciousness Explained (1991); Darwin's Dangerous Idea (1995); Breaking the Spell (2006)
- Notable ideas: Heterophenomenology; Intentional stance Intuition pump Multiple drafts model Greedy reductionism Cartesian theater Cartesian materialism Belief in belief Real patterns Free-floating rationale Top-down vs bottom-up design Cassette theory of dreams Alternative neurosurgery Sphexishness; Brainstorm machine Deepity

Daniel Clement Dennett III (March 28, 1942 – April 19, 2024) was an American philosopher and cognitive scientist. His research centered on philosophy of mind, philosophy of science, and philosophy of biology, particularly as those fields relate to evolutionary biology and cognitive science.

Dennett was the co-director of the Center for Cognitive Studies and the Austin B. Fletcher Professor of Philosophy at Tufts University in Massachusetts. Dennett was a member of the editorial board for The Rutherford Journal and a co-founder of The Clergy Project.

Dennett has been described as "one of the most widely read and debated American philosophers". A vocal atheist and secularist, he was referred to as one of the "Four Horsemen" of New Atheism, along with Richard Dawkins, Sam Harris, and Christopher Hitchens.

== Early life and education ==
Daniel Clement Dennett III was born on March 28, 1942, in Boston, Massachusetts, the son of Ruth Marjorie (née Leck; 1903–1971) and Daniel Clement Dennett Jr. (1910–1947).

Dennett spent part of his childhood in Lebanon, where, during World War II, his father, who had a PhD in Islamic studies from Harvard University, was a covert counter-intelligence agent with the Office of Strategic Services posing as a cultural attaché to the American Embassy in Beirut. His mother, an English major at Carleton College, went for a master's degree at the University of Minnesota before becoming an English teacher at the American Community School in Beirut. In 1947, his father was killed in a plane crash in Ethiopia. Shortly after, his mother took him back to Massachusetts. Dennett's sister is the investigative journalist Charlotte Dennett.

Dennett said that he was first introduced to the notion of philosophy while attending Camp Mowglis in Hebron, New Hampshire, at age 11, when a camp counselor said to him, "You know what you are, Daniel? You're a philosopher."

Dennett graduated from Phillips Exeter Academy in 1959, and spent one year at Wesleyan University before receiving his BA degree in philosophy at Harvard University in 1963. There, he was a student of Willard Van Orman Quine. He had decided to transfer to Harvard after reading Quine's From a Logical Point of View and, thinking that Quine was wrong about some things, decided, as he said "as only a freshman could, that I had to go to Harvard and confront this man with my corrections to his errors!"

== Academic career ==
In 1965, Dennett received his DPhil in philosophy at the University of Oxford, where he studied under Gilbert Ryle and was a member of Hertford College. His doctoral dissertation was entitled The Mind and the Brain: Introspective Description in the Light of Neurological Findings; Intentionality.

From 1965 to 1971, Dennett taught at the University of California, Irvine, before moving to Tufts University where he taught for five decades. He also spent periods visiting at Harvard University and several other universities. Dennett described himself as "an autodidact—or, more properly, the beneficiary of hundreds of hours of informal tutorials on all the fields that interest me, from some of the world's leading scientists".

Throughout his career, he was an interdisciplinarian who argued for "breaking the silos of knowledge", and he collaborated widely with computer scientists, cognitive scientists, and biologists.

Dennett co-edited and co-authored the 1981 collection The Mind's I with Douglas Hofstadter. He wrote an afterword for the 1999 reissue of The Extended Phenotype by Richard Dawkins. He wrote an introduction to a 2002 edition of Gilbert Ryle's The Concept of Mind. Dennett was the recipient of a Fulbright Fellowship and two Guggenheim Fellowships.

He retired emeritus from Tufts in 2022 in a shared celebration with his longtime friend and colleague in philosophy George E. Smith.

== Philosophical views ==
=== Free will and determinism ===
While he was a confirmed compatibilist on free will, in "On Giving Libertarians What They Say They Want"—chapter 15 of his 1978 book Brainstorms—Dennett articulated the case for a two-stage model of decision making in contrast to libertarian views.

The model of decision making I am proposing has the following feature: when we are faced with an important decision, a consideration-generator whose output is to some degree undetermined, produces a series of considerations, some of which may of course be immediately rejected as irrelevant by the agent (consciously or unconsciously). Those considerations that are selected by the agent as having a more than negligible bearing on the decision then figure in a reasoning process, and if the agent is in the main reasonable, those considerations ultimately serve as predictors and explicators of the agent's final decision.

While other philosophers have developed two-stage models, including William James, Henri Poincaré, Arthur Compton, and Henry Margenau, Dennett defended this model for the following reasons:

1. First ... The intelligent selection, rejection, and weighing of the considerations that do occur to the subject is a matter of intelligence making the difference.
2. Second, I think it installs indeterminism in the right place for the libertarian, if there is a right place at all.
3. Third ... from the point of view of biological engineering, it is just more efficient and in the end more rational that decision making should occur in this way.
4. A fourth observation in favor of the model is that it permits moral education to make a difference, without making all of the difference.
5. Fifth—and I think this is perhaps the most important thing to be said in favor of this model—it provides some account of our important intuition that we are the authors of our moral decisions.
6. Finally, the model I propose points to the multiplicity of decisions that encircle our moral decisions and suggests that in many cases our ultimate decision as to which way to act is less important phenomenologically as a contributor to our sense of free will than the prior decisions affecting our deliberation process itself: the decision, for instance, not to consider any further, to terminate deliberation; or the decision to ignore certain lines of inquiry.

These prior and subsidiary decisions contribute, I think, to our sense of ourselves as responsible free agents, roughly in the following way: I am faced with an important decision to make, and after a certain amount of deliberation, I say to myself: "That's enough. I've considered this matter enough and now I'm going to act," in the full knowledge that I could have considered further, in the full knowledge that the eventualities may prove that I decided in error, but with the acceptance of responsibility in any case.

Leading libertarian philosophers such as Robert Kane have rejected Dennett's model, specifically that random chance is directly involved in a decision, on the basis that they believe this eliminates the agent's motives and reasons, character and values, and feelings and desires. They claim that, if chance is the primary cause of decisions, then agents cannot be liable for resultant actions. Kane says:

[As Dennett admits,] a causal indeterminist view of this deliberative kind does not give us everything libertarians have wanted from free will. For [the agent] does not have complete control over what chance images and other thoughts enter his mind or influence his deliberation. They simply come as they please. [The agent] does have some control after the chance considerations have occurred.

But then there is no more chance involved. What happens from then on, how he reacts, is determined by desires and beliefs he already has. So it appears that he does not have control in the libertarian sense of what happens after the chance considerations occur as well. Libertarians require more than this for full responsibility and free will.

=== Mind ===
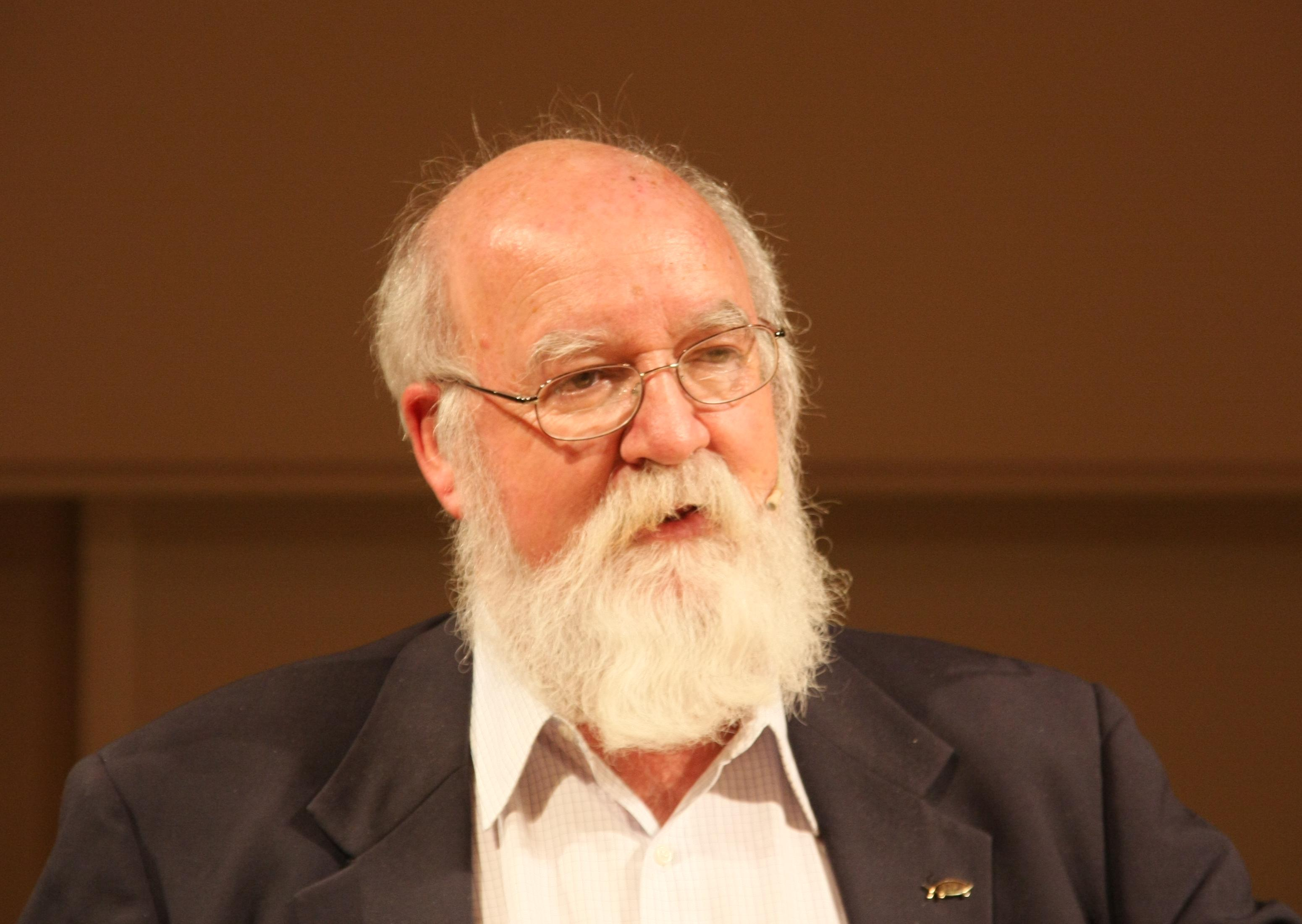
Dennett in 2008

Dennett was a proponent of materialism in the philosophy of mind. He argued that mental states, including consciousness, are entirely the result of physical processes in the brain. In his book Consciousness Explained (1991), Dennett presented his arguments for a materialist understanding of consciousness, rejecting Cartesian dualism in favor of a physicalist perspective.

Dennett remarked in several places (such as "Self-portrait", in Brainchildren) that his overall philosophical project remained largely the same from his time at Oxford onwards. He was primarily concerned with providing a philosophy of mind that is grounded in empirical research. In his original dissertation, Content and Consciousness, he broke up the problem of explaining the mind into the need for a theory of content and for a theory of consciousness. His approach to this project also stayed true to this distinction. Just as Content and Consciousness has a bipartite structure, he similarly divided Brainstorms into two sections. He would later collect several essays on content in The Intentional Stance and synthesize his views on consciousness into a unified theory in Consciousness Explained. These volumes respectively form the most extensive development of his views.

In chapter 5 of Consciousness Explained, Dennett described his multiple drafts model of consciousness. In this model, various streams of information-processing compete for "cerebral celebrity" at any given moment. Central to this theory is the metaphor of the "Joycean machine," which describes human consciousness as a Virtual Machine, a serial software layer composed of language and habits (memes) running on the highly parallel hardware of the biological brain. By this logic, Dennett argues that the "Self" is not a physical organ or a soul, but a "Center of Narrative Gravity"—a useful fiction that the brain constructs to make sense of its own behavior to itself and others.

He stated that, "all varieties of perception—indeed all varieties of thought or mental activity—are accomplished in the brain by parallel, multitrack processes of interpretation and elaboration of sensory inputs. Information entering the nervous system is under continuous 'editorial revision.' " Later he asserts, "These yield, over the course of time, something rather like a narrative stream or sequence, which can be thought of as subject to continual editing by many processes distributed around the brain, ..."

In this work, Dennett's interest in the ability of evolution to explain some of the content-producing features of consciousness is already apparent, and this later became an integral part of his program. He stated his view is materialist and scientific, and he presents an argument against qualia; he argued that the concept of qualia is so confused that it cannot be put to any use or understood in any non-contradictory way, and therefore does not constitute a valid refutation of physicalism.

This view is rejected by neuroscientists Gerald Edelman, Antonio Damasio, Vilayanur Ramachandran, Giulio Tononi, and Rodolfo Llinás, all of whom state that qualia exist and that the desire to eliminate them is based on an erroneous interpretation on the part of some philosophers regarding what constitutes science.

Dennett described phenomenal consciousness as a "user illusion" experienced by the brain as a means of hiding its underlying complexity from itself. His views on consciousness were incorporated into the program known as illusionism, which Dennett then called "the obvious default theory of consciousness".

Dennett's strategy mirrored his teacher Ryle's approach of redefining first-person phenomena in third-person terms, and denying the coherence of the concepts which this approach struggles with.

Dennett self-identified with a few terms:

[Others] note that my "avoidance of the standard philosophical terminology for discussing such matters" often creates problems for me; philosophers have a hard time figuring out what I am saying and what I am denying. My refusal to play ball with my colleagues is deliberate, of course, since I view the standard philosophical terminology as worse than useless—a major obstacle to progress since it consists of so many errors.

In Consciousness Explained, he affirmed "I am a sort of 'teleofunctionalist', of course, perhaps the original teleofunctionalist". He went on to say, "I am ready to come out of the closet as some sort of verificationist."

Dennett was credited with inspiring false belief tasks used in developmental psychology. He noted that when four-year-olds watch the Punch and Judy puppet show, they laugh because they know that they know more about what's going on than one of the characters does:

Very young children watching a Punch and Judy show squeal in anticipatory delight as Punch prepares to throw the box over the cliff. Why? Because they know Punch thinks Judy is still in the box. They know better; they saw Judy escape while Punch's back was turned. We take the children's excitement as overwhelmingly good evidence that they understand the situation--they understand that Punch is acting on a mistaken belief (although they are not sophisticated enough to put it that way).

=== Evolutionary debate ===
Much of Dennett's work from the 1990s onwards was concerned with fleshing out his previous ideas by addressing the same topics from an evolutionary standpoint, ranging from what distinguishes human minds from animal minds (Kinds of Minds), to how free will is compatible with a naturalist view of the world (Freedom Evolves).

Dennett saw evolution by natural selection as an algorithmic process (though he spelt out that algorithms as simple as long division often incorporate a significant degree of randomness). This idea is in conflict with the evolutionary philosophy of paleontologist Stephen Jay Gould, who preferred to stress the "pluralism" of evolution (i.e., its dependence on many crucial factors, of which natural selection is only one).

Dennett's views on evolution are identified as being strongly adaptationist, in line with his theory of the intentional stance, and the evolutionary views of biologist Richard Dawkins. In Darwin's Dangerous Idea, Dennett showed himself even more willing than Dawkins to defend adaptationism in print, devoting an entire chapter to a criticism of the ideas of Gould. This stems from Gould's long-running public debate with E. O. Wilson and other evolutionary biologists over human sociobiology and its descendant evolutionary psychology, which Gould and Richard Lewontin opposed, but which Dennett advocated, together with Dawkins and Steven Pinker. Gould argued that Dennett overstated his claims and misrepresented Gould's, to reinforce what Gould describes as Dennett's "Darwinian fundamentalism".

=== Religion and morality ===
Dennett was a vocal atheist and secularist, a member of the Secular Coalition for America advisory board, and a member of the Committee for Skeptical Inquiry, as well as an outspoken supporter of the Brights movement. Dennett was referred to as one of the "Four Horsemen of New Atheism", along with Richard Dawkins, Sam Harris, and the late Christopher Hitchens.

Dennett sends a solidarity message to ex-Muslims convening in London in July 2017.

In Darwin's Dangerous Idea, Dennett wrote that evolution can account for the origin of morality. He rejected the idea that morality being natural to us implies that we should take a skeptical position regarding ethics, noting that what is fallacious in the naturalistic fallacy is not to support values per se, but rather to rush from facts to values.

In his 2006 book, Breaking the Spell: Religion as a Natural Phenomenon, Dennett attempted to account for religious belief naturalistically, explaining possible evolutionary reasons for the phenomenon of religious adherence. In this book he declared himself to be "a bright", and defended the term.

He did research into clerics who are secretly atheists and how they rationalize their works. He found what he called a "don't ask, don't tell" conspiracy because believers did not want to hear of loss of faith. This made unbelieving preachers feel isolated, but they did not want to lose their jobs and church-supplied lodgings. Generally, they consoled themselves with the belief that they were doing good in their pastoral roles by providing comfort and required ritual. The research, with Linda LaScola, was further extended to include other denominations and non-Christian clerics. The research and stories Dennett and LaScola accumulated during this project were published in their 2013 co-authored book, Caught in the Pulpit: Leaving Belief Behind.

=== Memetics, postmodernism and deepity ===
In From Bacteria to Bach and Back, Dennett deepened the analogy between memes (units of cultural information) and genes (units of genetic information), with both going through an evolutionary process. He also proposed that memes (particularly words) are necessary building blocks for understanding.

Dennett was critical of postmodernism, having said:

Postmodernism, the school of "thought" that proclaimed "There are no truths, only interpretations" has largely played itself out in absurdity, but it has left behind a generation of academics in the humanities disabled by their distrust of the very idea of truth and their disrespect for evidence, settling for "conversations" in which nobody is wrong and nothing can be confirmed, only asserted with whatever style you can muster.

Dennett adopted and somewhat redefined the term "deepity", originally coined by Miriam Weizenbaum. Dennett used "deepity" for a statement that has two meanings: one that is true but trivial, and another that sounds profound and would be important if true, but is actually false or meaningless. Examples are "Que será será!", "Beauty is only skin deep!", "The power of intention can transform your life."

=== Artificial intelligence ===
While approving of the increase in efficiency that humans reap by using resources such as expert systems in medicine or GPS in navigation, Dennett saw a danger in machines performing an ever-increasing proportion of basic tasks in perception, memory, and algorithmic computation because people may tend to anthropomorphize such systems and attribute intellectual powers to them that they do not possess. He believed the relevant danger from artificial intelligence (AI) is that people will misunderstand the nature of basically "parasitic" AI systems, rather than employing them constructively to challenge and develop the human user's powers of comprehension.

In the 1990s, Dennett collaborated with a group of computer scientists at MIT to attempt to develop a humanoid, conscious robot, named "Cog". The project did not produce a conscious robot, but Dennett argued that in principle it could have.

As given in his penultimate book, From Bacteria to Bach and Back, Dennett's views were contrary to those of Nick Bostrom. Although acknowledging that it is "possible in principle" to create AI with human-like comprehension and agency, Dennett maintained that the difficulties of any such "strong AI" project would be orders of magnitude greater than those raising concerns have realized. Dennett believed, as of the book's publication in 2017, that the prospect of superintelligence (AI massively exceeding the cognitive performance of humans in all domains) was at least 50 years away, and of far less pressing significance than other problems the world faces.

=== Realism ===
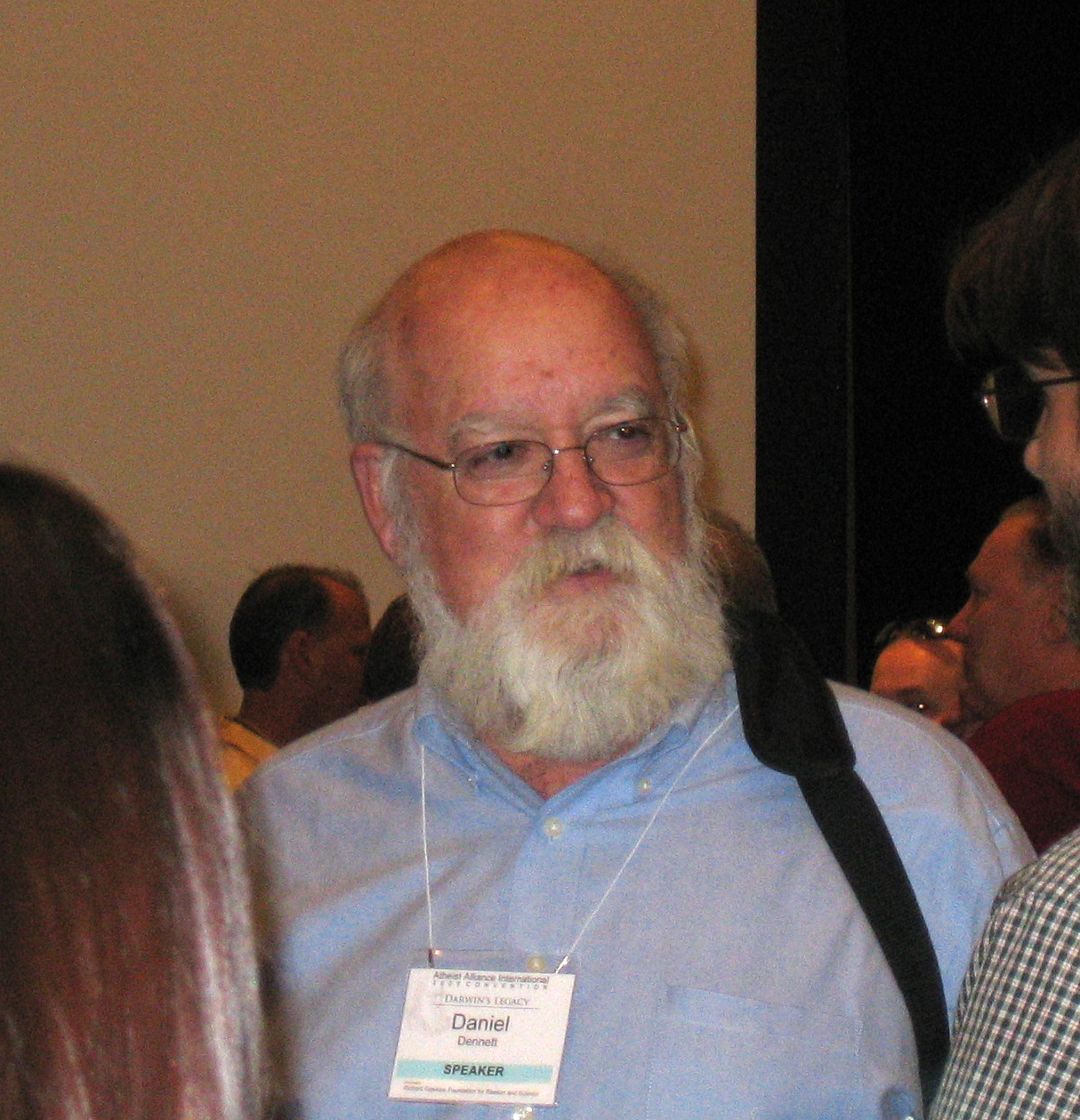
Dennett in 2011

Dennett was known for his nuanced stance on realism. While he supported scientific realism, advocating that entities and phenomena posited by scientific theories exist independently of our perceptions, he leant towards instrumentalism concerning certain theoretical entities, valuing their explanatory and predictive utility, as showing in his discussion of real patterns. Dennett's pragmatic realism underlines the entanglement of language, consciousness, and reality. He posited that our discourse about reality is mediated by our cognitive and linguistic capacities, marking a departure from Naïve realism.

==== Realism and instrumentalism ====
Dennett's philosophical stance on realism was intricately connected to his views on instrumentalism and the theory of real patterns. He drew a distinction between illata, which are genuine theoretical entities like electrons, and abstracta, which are "calculation bound entities or logical constructs" such as centers of gravity and the equator, placing beliefs and the like among the latter. One of Dennett's principal arguments was an instrumentalistic construal of intentional attributions, asserting that such attributions are environment-relative.

In discussing intentional states, Dennett posited that they should not be thought of as resembling theoretical entities, but rather as logical constructs, avoiding the pitfalls of intentional realism without lapsing into pure instrumentalism or even eliminativism. His instrumentalism and anti-realism were crucial aspects of his view on intentionality, emphasizing the centrality and indispensability of the intentional stance to our conceptual scheme.

== Recognition ==
Dennett was the recipient of a Fellowship at the Center for Advanced Study in the Behavioral Sciences. He was a Fellow of the Committee for Skeptical Inquiry and a Humanist Laureate of the International Academy of Humanism. He was named 2004 Humanist of the Year by the American Humanist Association. In 2006, Dennett received the Golden Plate Award of the American Academy of Achievement. He became a Fellow of the American Association for the Advancement of Science in 2009.

In February 2010, he was named to the Freedom From Religion Foundation's Honorary Board of distinguished achievers. In 2012, he was awarded the Erasmus Prize, an annual award for a person who has made an exceptional contribution to European culture, society or social science, "for his ability to translate the cultural significance of science and technology to a broad audience". In 2018, he was awarded an honorary doctorate (Dr.h.c.) by the Radboud University in Nijmegen, Netherlands, for his contributions to and influence on cross-disciplinary science.

== Personal life ==
In 1962, Dennett married Susan Bell. They lived in North Andover, Massachusetts, and had a daughter, a son, and six grandchildren. He was an avid sailor who loved sailing Xanthippe, his 13-meter sailboat. He also played many musical instruments and sang at glee clubs.

Dennett died of interstitial lung disease at Maine Medical Center on April 19, 2024, at the age of 82.

== Selected works ==
- Brainstorms: Philosophical Essays on Mind and Psychology (MIT Press 1981) (ISBN 0-262-54037-1)
- Hofstadter, Douglas R.; Dennett, Daniel C. (1981). The Mind's I: Fantasies And Reflections On Self & Soul. Basic Books. ISBN 978-0-465-03091-0.
- Elbow Room: The Varieties of Free Will Worth Wanting (MIT Press 1984) – on free will and determinism (ISBN 0-262-04077-8)
- Content and Consciousness (Routledge & Kegan Paul Books Ltd; 2nd ed. 1986) (ISBN 0-7102-0846-4)
- The Intentional Stance (6th printing), Cambridge, Massachusetts: The MIT Press, 1996, ISBN 0-262-54053-3 (First published 1987)
- Consciousness Explained (Back Bay Books 1991) (ISBN 0-316-18066-1)
- Darwin's Dangerous Idea: Evolution and the Meanings of Life (Simon & Schuster; reprint edition 1996) (ISBN 0-684-82471-X)
- Kinds of Minds: Towards an Understanding of Consciousness (Basic Books 1997) (ISBN 0-465-07351-4)
- Brainchildren: Essays on Designing Minds (Representation and Mind) (MIT Press 1998) (ISBN 0-262-04166-9) – A Collection of Essays 1984–1996
- Freedom Evolves (Viking Press 2003) (ISBN 0-670-03186-0)
- Sweet Dreams: Philosophical Obstacles to a Science of Consciousness (MIT Press 2005) (ISBN 0-262-04225-8)
- Breaking the Spell: Religion as a Natural Phenomenon (Penguin Group 2006) (ISBN 0-670-03472-X).
- Neuroscience and Philosophy: Brain, Mind, and Language (Columbia University Press 2007) (ISBN 978-0-231-14044-7), co-authored with Max Bennett, Peter Hacker, and John Searle
- Science and Religion: Are They Compatible? (Oxford University Press 2010) (ISBN 0-199-73842-4), co-authored with Alvin Plantinga
- Intuition Pumps and Other Tools for Thinking (W. W. Norton & Company 2013) (ISBN 0-393-08206-7)
- Caught in the Pulpit: Leaving Belief Behind (Pitchstone Publishing – 2013) (ISBN 978-1634310208) co-authored with Linda LaScola
- Inside Jokes: Using Humor to Reverse-Engineer the Mind (MIT Press – 2011) (ISBN 978-0-262-01582-0), co-authored with Matthew M. Hurley and Reginald B. Adams Jr.
- From Bacteria to Bach and Back: The Evolution of Minds (W. W. Norton & Company – 2017) (ISBN 978-0-393-24207-2)
- I've Been Thinking (Allen Lane 2023) (ISBN 978-0-393-86805-0)

== See also ==
- The Atheism Tapes
- Cognitive biology
- Evolutionary psychology of religion
