= Consciousness Explained =

1991 book by Daniel Dennett

- Cover of the first edition
- Author: Daniel C. Dennett
- Language: English
- Subject: Consciousness
- Publisher: Little, Brown and Co.
- Publication date: 1991
- Publication place: United States
- Media type: Print (hardcover and paperback)
- Pages: 511
- ISBN: 0-316-18065-3
- OCLC: 23648691
- Dewey Decimal: 126 20
- LC Class: B105.C477 D45 1991
- Preceded by: The Intentional Stance
- Followed by: Darwin's Dangerous Idea

Consciousness Explained is a 1991 book by the American philosopher Daniel Dennett, in which the author offers an account of how consciousness arises from interaction of physical and cognitive processes in the brain. Dennett describes consciousness as an account of the various calculations occurring in the brain at close to the same time. He compares consciousness to an academic paper that is being developed or edited in the hands of several people at once, the "multiple drafts" theory of consciousness. In this analogy, "the paper" exists even though there is no single, unified paper. When people report on their inner experiences, Dennett considers their reports to be more like theorizing than like describing. These reports may be informative, he says, but a psychologist is not to take them at face value. Dennett describes several phenomena that show that perception is more limited and less reliable than we perceive it to be.

Dennett's views set out in Consciousness Explained put him at odds with thinkers who say that consciousness can be described only with reference to "qualia", i.e., the raw content of experience. Critics of the book have said that Dennett is denying the existence of subjective conscious states, while giving the appearance of giving a scientific explanation of them.

== Summary ==
Dennett puts forward a "multiple drafts" model of consciousness, suggesting that there is no single central place (a "Cartesian theater") where conscious experience occurs; instead there are "various events of content-fixation occurring in various places at various times in the brain". The brain consists of a "bundle of semi-independent agencies"; when "content-fixation" takes place in one of these, its effects may propagate so that it leads to the utterance of one of the sentences that make up the story in which the central character is one's "self". Dennett's view of consciousness is that it is the apparently serial account for the brain's underlying process in which multiple calculations are happening at once (that is, parallelism).

One of Dennett's more controversial claims is that qualia do not (and cannot) exist as qualia are described to be. Dennett's main argument is that the various properties attributed to qualia by philosophers—qualia are supposed to be incorrigible, ineffable, private, directly accessible and so on—are incompatible, so the notion of qualia is incoherent. The non-existence of qualia would mean that there is no hard problem of consciousness, and "philosophical zombies", which are supposed to act like a human in every way while somehow lacking qualia, cannot exist. So, as Dennett wryly notes, he is committed to the belief that we are all philosophical zombies (if you define the term "philosophical zombie" as functionally identical to a human being without any additional non-material aspects)—adding that his remark should not be quoted out of context.

Dennett claims that our brains hold only a few salient details about the world, and that this is the only reason we are able to function at all. Thus, we do not store elaborate pictures in short-term memory, as this is not necessary and would consume valuable computing power. Rather, we log what has changed and assume the rest has stayed the same, with the result that we miss some details, as demonstrated in various experiments and illusions, some of which Dennett outlines. Research subsequent to Dennett's book indicates that some of his postulations were more conservative than expected. A year after Consciousness Explained was published, Dennett noted "I wish in retrospect that I'd been more daring, since the effects are stronger than I claimed". Since then, examples continue to accumulate of the illusory nature of our visual world.

A key philosophical method is heterophenomenology, in which the verbal or written reports of subjects are treated as akin to a theorist's fiction—the subject's report is not questioned, but it is not assumed to be an incorrigible report about that subject's inner state. This approach allows the reports of the subject to be a datum in psychological research, thus circumventing the limits of classical behaviorism.

Dennett says that only a theory that explained conscious events in terms of unconscious events could explain consciousness at all: "To explain is to explain away".

== Reception ==
The New York Times designated Consciousness Explained as one of the ten best books of the year. In New York Times Book Review, George Johnson called it "nothing short of brilliant".

Neuroscientist Stanislas Dehaene has stated that his research on consciousness was "heavily influenced" by Consciousness Explained, and that the "level of clarity of mind, attention to detail, and knowledge of empirical paradigms is quite rare" in consciousness literature.

Critics of Dennett's approach argue that Dennett fails to engage with the hard problem of consciousness by equivocating subjective experience with behavior or cognition. In his 1996 book The Conscious Mind, philosopher David Chalmers argues that Dennett's position is "a denial" of consciousness, and jokingly wonders if Dennett is a philosophical zombie. Critics believe that the book's title is misleading as it fails to actually explain consciousness. Detractors have provided the alternative titles of Consciousness Ignored and Consciousness Explained Away.

John Searle argues that Dennett, who insists that discussing subjectivity is nonsense because it is unscientific and science presupposes objectivity, is making a category error. Searle argues that the goal of science is to establish and validate statements which are epistemically objective (i.e., whose truth can be discovered and evaluated by any interested party), but these statements can be about what is ontologically subjective. Searle states that the epistemic objectivity of the scientific method does not preclude the ontological subjectivity of the subject matter. For example, pain is a subjective experience whose existence is not in doubt. One of the aims of neurology is to understand and treat it. Searle calls any value judgment epistemically subjective. Thus, "McKinley is prettier than Everest" is epistemically subjective, whereas "McKinley is higher than Everest" is epistemically objective. In other words, the latter statement is evaluable (in fact, falsifiable) by an understood ("background") criterion for mountain height, like "the summit is so many meters above sea level". No such criteria exist for prettiness. Searle writes that, in Dennett's view, there is "no consciousness in addition to the computational features, because that is all that consciousness amounts to for him: mere effects of a von Neumann(esque) virtual machine implemented in a parallel architecture", and therefore implies that conscious states are illusory. In contrast, Searle asserts that, "where consciousness is concerned, the existence of the appearance is the reality".

Searle wrote further:

To put it as clearly as I can: in his book, Consciousness Explained, Dennett denies the existence of consciousness. He continues to use the word, but he means something different by it. For him, it refers only to third-person phenomena, not to the first-person conscious feelings and experiences we all have. For Dennett there is no difference between us humans and complex zombies who lack any inner feelings, because we are all just complex zombies. ...I regard his view as self-refuting because it denies the existence of the data which a theory of consciousness is supposed to explain...Here is the paradox of this exchange: I am a conscious reviewer consciously answering the objections of an author who gives every indication of being consciously and puzzlingly angry. I do this for a readership that I assume is conscious. How then can I take seriously his claim that consciousness does not really exist?

Dennett and his illusionist supporters, however, respond that the aforementioned "subjective aspect" of conscious minds is nonexistent, an unscientific remnant of commonsense "folk psychology", and that his alleged redefinition is the only coherent description of consciousness.

Neuroscientists such as Gerald Edelman, Antonio Damasio, Vilayanur Ramachandran, Giulio Tononi, Christof Koch and Rodolfo Llinás argue that qualia exist and that the desire to eliminate them is based on an erroneous interpretation on the part of some philosophers regarding what constitutes science.

== See also ==
- Binding problem
- Change blindness
- Homunculus argument
- Philosophy of mind
- Physicalism
- Scientism
- Society of Mind
- The Conscious Mind
- Vertiginous question
