= Stan Franklin =

American scientist (1931–2023)

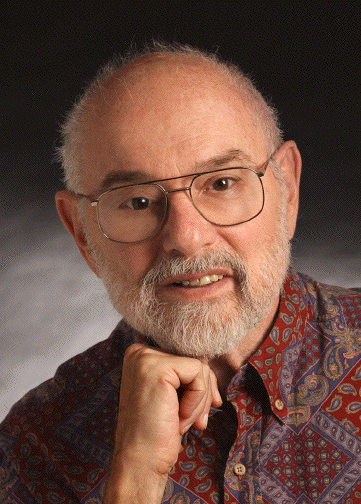
- Born: August 14, 1931; Memphis, Tennessee
- Died: January 23, 2023 (aged 91)
- Other names: SP Franklin, Chief Franklin
- Education: University of Memphis; University of California Los Angeles
- Known for: Creator of LIDA; Founder of the Cognitive Computing Research Group; Co-director of the Institute for Intelligent Systems;
- Scientific career
- Fields: Cognitive Modeling, General Topology
- Workplaces: University of Florida; Indian Institute of Technology Kanpur; Carnegie Mellon University; University of Memphis;
- Doctoral advisor: Robert Sorgenfrey

Stan Franklin (August 14, 1931 – January 23, 2023) was an American scientist. He was the W. Harry Feinstone Interdisciplinary Research Professor at the University of Memphis in Memphis, Tennessee, and co-director of the Institute of Intelligent Systems. He is the author of Artificial Minds (MIT Press, 1995), and the developer of IDA, and its successor LIDA, which are both computational implementations of global workspace theory. He is the founder of the Cognitive Computing Research Group at the University of Memphis.

== Life and work ==
Franklin speaking at the University of Memphis, 2008

Franklin was born in Memphis, Tennessee in 1931. His graduate degrees are from UCLA, and his undergraduate degree is from the University of Memphis. He has been on the faculties of the University of Florida, the Indian Institute of Technology Kanpur, Carnegie Mellon University, and the University of Memphis.

He was formerly a mathematician, who introduced the concept of sequential spaces. He then became first a computer scientist and then a cognitive scientist, Franklin has worked for some years on "conscious" software agents, which model the global workspace theory of consciousness. These autonomous agents computationally model human and animal cognition, and provide testable hypotheses for cognitive scientists and neuroscientists. This work was funded by the United States Navy and has been the subject of numerous papers in scientific journals and conference proceedings.

== Publications ==
Franklin has authored or co-authored numerous academic papers as well as a book entitled Artificial Minds published by MIT Press, which was a primary selection of the Library of Science book club, and has been translated into Japanese and Portuguese.

- Franklin, Stan; Madl, Tamas; Strain, Steve; Faghihi, Usef; Dong, Daqi; Kugele, Sean; Snaider, Javier; Agrawal, Pulin; Chen, Sheng (2016). "A LIDA cognitive model tutorial". Biologically Inspired Cognitive Architectures. 16: 105–130. doi:10.1016/j.bica.2016.04.003.
- Franklin, S., Strain, S., Snaider, J., McCall, R., & Faghihi, U. (2012)." Global Workspace Theory, its LIDA Model and the Underlying Neuroscience". Biologically Inspired Cognitive Architectures, 1, 32–43, doi:10.1016/j.bica.2012.04.001
- D'Mello, Sidney K., & Franklin, S. (2011). "A Cognitive Model's View of Animal Cognition". Current Zoology, 54(4), 499–512.
- Wallach, W.; Franklin, S.; & Allen, C. (2010). "A Conceptual and Computational Model of Moral Decision Making in Human and Artificial Agents" in Wallach, W. & Franklin, S. (eds.), Topics in Cognitive Science, special issue on Cognitive Based Theories of Moral Decision Making. pp. 454–485 Cognitive Science Society.
- Baars, B. J. & Franklin, S. (2009). "Consciousness is computational: The LIDA model of Global Workspace Theory". International Journal of Machine Consciousness, 1(1), 23–32.
- Franklin, S. (2007). "A Foundational Architecture for Artificial General Intelligence" in Goertzel B. & Wang, P. (eds.), Advances in Artificial General Intelligence: Concepts, Architectures and Algorithms, Proceedings of the AGI Workshop 2006 (pp. 36–54). Amsterdam: IOS Press.
- Franklin, S., & Ramamurthy, U. (2006). "Motivations, Values and Emotions: Three sides of the same coin". Proceedings of the Sixth International Workshop on Epigenetic Robotics (Vol. 128, pp. 41–48). Paris, France: Lund University Cognitive Studies.
- Franklin, S. 2005. "A 'Consciousness' Based Architecture for a Functioning Mind" in Visions of Mind, Davis, D. N. (ed.) Hershey, PA: Information Science Publishing.
- Franklin, S; Baars, B. J.; Ramamurthy, U. and Ventura, Matthew. 2005. "The role of consciousness in memory". Brains, Minds and Media 1: 1–38, pdf.
- Baars, Bernard J. and Franklin, Stan. 2003. "How conscious experience and working memory interact". Trends in Cognitive Sciences 7: 166–172.
- Franklin, Stan (2003), "IDA: A Conscious Artifact?" in Machine Consciousness, Holland, Owen (ed.) (Exeter, UK: Imprint Academic).
