= Seriation (semiotics) =

Concept in semiotics

The term seriation [mise en série] was proposed for use in semiotics by Jean Molino and derived from classical philology. Seriation "invokes the idea that any investigator, in order to assign some plausible meaning to a given phenomenon, must interpret it within a series of comparable phenomena." One cannot interpret what philology calls a hapax; that is, an isolated phenomenon. Art historian Erwin Panofsky has explained the situation in very clear terms:

- 'Whether we deal with historical or natural phenomena, the individual observation of phenomena assumes the character of a 'fact' only when it can be related to other, analogous observations in such a way that the whole series 'makes sense.' This 'sense' is, therefore, fully capable of being applied, as a control, to the interpretation of a new individual observation within the same range of phenomena. If, however, this new individual observation definitely refuses to be interpreted according to the 'sense' of the series, and if an error proves to be impossible, the 'sense' of the series will have to be reformulated to include the new individual observation' (1955, p. 35)" (1990, pp. 230–231).

A seriation is determined by the plot.

== Sources ==
- Molino, Jean (1974). Cited in Nattiez (1990).
- Nattiez, Jean-Jacques (1990). Music and Discourse: Toward a Semiology of Music (Musicologie générale et sémiologue, 1987). Translated by Carolyn Abbate (1990). ISBN 0-691-02714-5.
- Panofsky, Erwin (1955). Cited in Nattiez (1990).
