= Thought experiment =

Hypothetical situation

Schrödinger's cat (1935), devised by Schrödinger, presents a house cat that is in a superposition of alive and dead states, depending on a random quantum event; it illustrates the counter-intuitive implications of Bohr's Copenhagen interpretation when applied to everyday objects.

A thought experiment is an imaginary scenario that is meant to elucidate or test an argument or theory. It is often an experiment that would be hard, impossible, or unethical to actually perform. It can also be an abstract hypothetical that is meant to test our intuitions about morality or other fundamental questions of philosophy.

== History ==
Thought experiments were conceived as early as the ancient Greeks, who referred to them as δείκνυμι, deiknymi, as conceptual mathematical proofs.

Johann Witt-Hansen established that Hans Christian Ørsted was the first to use the equivalent German term Gedankenexperiment c. 1812. Ørsted was also the first to use the equivalent term Gedankenversuch in 1820.

By 1883, Ernst Mach used Gedankenexperiment in a different sense, to denote exclusively the imaginary conduct of a real experiment that would be subsequently performed as a real physical experiment by his students. Physical and mental experimentation could then be contrasted: Mach asked his students to provide him with explanations whenever the results from their subsequent, real, physical experiment differed from those of their prior, imaginary experiment.

The English term thought experiment was coined as a calque of Gedankenexperiment, and it first appeared in the 1897 English translation of one of Mach's papers. Prior to its emergence, the activity of posing hypothetical questions that employed subjunctive reasoning had existed for a very long time for both scientists and philosophers. The irrealis moods are ways to categorize it or to speak about it. This helps explain the extremely wide and diverse range of the application of the term thought experiment once it had been introduced into English.

Galileo's thought experiment concerned the outcome (c) of attaching a small stone (a) to a larger one (b).

Galileo's demonstration that falling objects must fall at the same rate regardless of their masses was a significant step forward in the history of modern science. This is widely thought to have been a straightforward physical demonstration, involving climbing up the Leaning Tower of Pisa and dropping two heavy weights off it, whereas in fact, it was a logical demonstration, using the thought experiment technique. The experiment is described by Galileo in his 1638 work Two New Sciences thus:

Salviati: "If then we take two bodies whose natural speeds are different, it is clear that on uniting the two, the more rapid one will be partly retarded by the slower, and the slower will be somewhat hastened by the swifter. Do you not agree with me in this opinion?"
Simplicio: "You are unquestionably right."
Salviati: "But if this is true, and if a large stone moves with a speed of, say, eight while a smaller moves with a speed of four, then when they are united, the system will move with a speed less than eight; but the two stones when tied together make a stone larger than that which before moved with a speed of eight. Hence the heavier body moves with less speed than the lighter; an effect which is contrary to your supposition. Thus you see how, from your assumption that the heavier body moves more rapidly than the lighter one, I infer that the heavier body moves more slowly."

== Uses ==
Thought experiments may be used to explore a hypothesis and the implementation of theories around it. They are also used in education, or for personal entertainment.

Examples of thought experiments include Schrödinger's cat, that was meant to attack the Copenhagen Interpretation of quantum mechanics by showing that its assumptions could lead to the seemingly absurd condition of a cat being simultaneously alive and dead, and Maxwell's demon, which attempts to demonstrate the ability of a hypothetical finite being to violate the Second Law of Thermodynamics.

It is a common element of science-fiction stories.

Thought experiments, which are well-structured, well-defined hypothetical questions that employ subjunctive reasoning (irrealis moods) – "What might happen (or, what might have happened) if . . . " – have been used to pose questions in philosophy at least since Greek antiquity, some pre-dating Socrates. In physics and other sciences many thought experiments date from the 19th and especially the 20th Century, but examples can be found at least as early as Galileo.

In thought experiments, we gain new information by rearranging or reorganizing empirical data in a new way and drawing new inferences from them, or by looking at these data from a different and unusual perspective. In Galileo's thought experiment, for example, the rearrangement of empirical experience consists of the original idea of combining bodies of different weights.

Thought experiments have been used in philosophy (especially ethics), physics, and other fields (such as cognitive psychology, history, political science, economics, social psychology, law, organizational studies, marketing, and epidemiology). In law, the synonym "hypothetical" is frequently used for such experiments.

Regardless of their intended goal, all thought experiments display a patterned way of thinking that is designed to allow us to explain, predict, and control events in a better and more productive way.

=== Theoretical consequences ===
In terms of their theoretical consequences, thought experiments generally:

- challenge (or even refute) a prevailing theory, often involving the device known as reductio ad absurdum, (as in Galileo's original argument, a proof by contradiction),
- confirm a prevailing theory,
- establish a new theory, or
- simultaneously refute a prevailing theory and establish a new theory through a process of mutual exclusion

=== Practical applications ===
Thought experiments can produce some very important and different outlooks on previously unknown or unaccepted theories. However, they may make those theories themselves irrelevant, and could possibly create new problems that are just as difficult, or possibly more difficult to resolve.

In terms of their practical application, thought experiments are generally created to:

- challenge the prevailing status quo (which includes activities such as correcting misinformation (or misapprehension), identify flaws in the argument(s) presented, to preserve (for the long-term) objectively established fact, and to refute specific assertions that some particular thing is permissible, forbidden, known, believed, possible, or necessary)
- extrapolate beyond (or interpolate within) the boundaries of already established fact
- predict and forecast the (otherwise) indefinite and unknowable future
- explain the past
- facilitate the retrodiction, postdiction and hindcasting of the otherwise indefinite and unknowable past
- facilitate decision making, choice, and strategy selection
- solve problems, and generate ideas;
- move current unsolved problems into another more productive problem space (e.g. functional fixedness)
- attribute causation, preventability, blame, and responsibility for specific outcomes
- assess culpability and compensatory damages in social and legal contexts
- ensure the repeat of past success
- examine the extent to which past events might have occurred differently
- ensure the future avoidance of past failures

== Fields ==
Thought experiments have been used in a variety of fields, including philosophy, law, physics, and mathematics. In philosophy they have been used at least since classical antiquity, some pre-dating Socrates. In law, they were well known to Roman lawyers quoted in the Digest. In physics and other sciences, notable thought experiments date from the 19th and, especially, the 20th century; but examples can be found at least as early as Galileo.

=== Philosophy ===
In philosophy, a thought experiment typically presents an imagined scenario with the intention of eliciting an intuitive or reasoned response about the way things are in the thought experiment. (Philosophers might also supplement their thought experiments with theoretical reasoning designed to support the desired intuitive response.) The scenario will typically be designed to target a particular philosophical notion, such as morality, or the nature of the mind or linguistic reference. The response to the imagined scenario is supposed to tell us about the nature of that notion in any scenario, real or imagined.

For example, a thought experiment might present a situation in which an agent intentionally kills an innocent for the benefit of others. Here, the relevant question is not whether the action is moral or not, but more broadly whether a moral theory is correct that says morality is determined solely by an action's consequences (See Consequentialism). John Searle imagines a man in a locked room who receives written sentences in Chinese, and returns written sentences in Chinese, according to a sophisticated instruction manual. Here, the relevant question is not whether or not the man understands Chinese, but more broadly, whether a functionalist theory of mind is correct.

It is generally hoped that there is universal agreement about the intuitions that a thought experiment elicits. (Hence, in assessing their own thought experiments, philosophers may appeal to "what we should say," or some such locution.) A successful thought experiment will be one in which intuitions about it are widely shared. But often, philosophers differ in their intuitions about the scenario.

Other philosophical uses of imagined scenarios arguably are thought experiments also. In one use of scenarios, philosophers might imagine persons in a particular situation (maybe ourselves), and ask what they would do.

For example, in the veil of ignorance, John Rawls asks us to imagine a group of persons in a situation where they know nothing about themselves, and are charged with devising a social or political organization. The use of the state of nature to imagine the origins of government, as by Thomas Hobbes and John Locke, may also be considered a thought experiment. Søren Kierkegaard explored the possible ethical and religious implications of Abraham's binding of Isaac in Fear and Trembling. Similarly, Friedrich Nietzsche, in On the Genealogy of Morals, speculated about the historical development of Judeo-Christian morality, with the intent of questioning its legitimacy.

An early written thought experiment was Plato's allegory of the cave. Another historic thought experiment was Avicenna's "floating man" thought experiment in the 11th century. He asked his readers to imagine themselves suspended in the air isolated from all sensations in order to demonstrate human self-awareness and self-consciousness, and the substantiality of the soul.

=== Science ===
Scientists tend to use thought experiments as imaginary, "proxy" experiments prior to a real, "physical" experiment (Ernst Mach always argued that these gedankenexperiments were "a necessary precondition for physical experiment"). In these cases, the result of the "proxy" experiment will often be so clear that there will be no need to conduct a physical experiment at all.

Scientists also use thought experiments when particular physical experiments are impossible to conduct (Carl Gustav Hempel labeled these sorts of experiment "theoretical experiments-in-imagination"), such as Einstein's thought experiment of chasing a light beam, leading to special relativity. This is a unique use of a scientific thought experiment, in that it was never carried out, but led to a successful theory, proven by other empirical means.

== Properties ==
Further categorization of thought experiments can be attributed to specific properties.

=== Possibility ===
In many thought experiments, the scenario would be nomologically possible, or possible according to the laws of nature. John Searle's Chinese room is nomologically possible.

Some thought experiments present scenarios that are not nomologically possible. In his Twin Earth thought experiment, Hilary Putnam asks us to imagine a scenario in which there is a substance with all of the observable properties of water (e.g., taste, color, boiling point), but is chemically different from water. It has been argued that this thought experiment is not nomologically possible, although it may be possible in some other sense, such as metaphysical possibility. It is debatable whether the nomological impossibility of a thought experiment renders intuitions about it moot.

In some cases, the hypothetical scenario might be considered metaphysically impossible, or impossible in any sense at all. David Chalmers says that we can imagine that there are zombies, or persons who are physically identical to us in every way but who lack consciousness. This is supposed to show that physicalism is false. However, some argue that zombies are inconceivable: we can no more imagine a zombie than we can imagine that 1+1=3. Others have claimed that the conceivability of a scenario may not entail its possibility.

=== Causal reasoning ===
The first characteristic pattern that thought experiments display is their orientation in time. They are either:

- Antefactual speculations: experiments that speculate about what might have happened prior to a specific, designated event, or
- Postfactual speculations: experiments that speculate about what may happen subsequent to (or consequent upon) a specific, designated event.

The second characteristic pattern is their movement in time in relation to "the present moment standpoint" of the individual performing the experiment; namely, in terms of:

- Their temporal direction: are they past-oriented or future-oriented?
- Their temporal sense:
  - (a) in the case of past-oriented thought experiments, are they examining the consequences of temporal "movement" from the present to the past, or from the past to the present? or,
  - (b) in the case of future-oriented thought experiments, are they examining the consequences of temporal "movement" from the present to the future, or from the future to the present?

=== Relation to real experiments ===
The relation to real experiments can be quite complex, as can be seen again from an example going back to Albert Einstein. In 1935, with two coworkers, he published a paper on a newly created subject called later the EPR effect (EPR paradox). In this paper, starting from certain philosophical assumptions, on the basis of a rigorous analysis of a certain, complicated, but in the meantime assertedly realizable model, he came to the conclusion that quantum mechanics should be described as "incomplete". Niels Bohr asserted a refutation of Einstein's analysis immediately, and his view prevailed. After some decades, it was asserted that feasible experiments could prove the error of the EPR paper. These experiments tested the Bell inequalities published in 1964 in a purely theoretical paper. The above-mentioned EPR philosophical starting assumptions were considered to be falsified by the empirical fact (e.g. by the optical real experiments of Alain Aspect).

Thus thought experiments belong to a theoretical discipline, usually to theoretical physics, but often to theoretical philosophy. In any case, it must be distinguished from a real experiment, which belongs naturally to the experimental discipline and has "the final decision on true or not true", at least in physics.

=== Interactivity ===
Thought experiments can also be interactive where the author invites people into his thought process through providing alternative paths with alternative outcomes within the narrative, or through interaction with a programmed machine, like a computer program.

Thanks to the advent of the Internet, the digital space has lent itself as a new medium for a new kind of thought experiments. The philosophical work of Stefano Gualeni, for example, focuses on the use of virtual worlds to materialize thought experiments and to playfully negotiate philosophical ideas. His arguments were originally presented in his 2015 book Virtual Worlds as Philosophical Tools.

Gualeni's argument is that the history of philosophy has, until recently, merely been the history of written thought, and digital media can complement and enrich the limited and almost exclusively linguistic approach to philosophical thought. He considers virtual worlds (like those interactively encountered in videogames) to be philosophically viable and advantageous. This is especially the case in thought experiments, when the recipients of a certain philosophical notion or perspective are expected to objectively test and evaluate different possible courses of action, or in cases where they are confronted with interrogatives concerning non-actual or non-human phenomenologies.

== Examples ==
=== Humanities ===
- Doomsday argument (anthropic principle)
- The Lady, or the Tiger? (human nature)
- The beer question (U.S. politics)

=== Physics ===
- Bell's spaceship paradox (special relativity)
- Brownian ratchet (Richard Feynman's "perpetual motion" machine that does not violate the second law and does no work at thermal equilibrium)
- Bucket argument – argues that space is absolute, not relational
- Dyson sphere
- Einstein's box
- Elitzur–Vaidman bomb-tester (quantum mechanics)
- EPR paradox (quantum mechanics) (forms of this have been performed)
- Everett phone (quantum mechanics)
- Feynman sprinkler (classical mechanics)
- Galileo's Leaning Tower of Pisa experiment (rebuttal of Aristotelian Gravity)
- Galileo's ship (classical relativity principle) 1632
- GHZ experiment (quantum mechanics)
- Heisenberg's microscope (quantum mechanics)
- Kepler's Dream (change of point of view as support for the Copernican hypothesis)
- Ladder paradox (special relativity)
- Laplace's demon
- Maxwell's demon (thermodynamics) 1871
- Mermin's device (quantum mechanics)
- Moving magnet and conductor problem
- Newton's cannonball (Newton's laws of motion)
- Popper's experiment (quantum mechanics)
- Quantum pseudo telepathy (quantum mechanics)
- Quantum suicide and immortality (quantum mechanics)
- Renninger negative-result experiment (quantum mechanics)
- Schrödinger's cat (quantum mechanics)
- Sticky bead argument (general relativity)
- The Monkey and the Hunter (gravitation)
- Twin paradox (special relativity)
- Wheeler's delayed choice experiment (quantum mechanics)
- Wigner's friend (quantum mechanics)

=== Philosophy ===
- Artificial brain
- Avicenna's Floating man
- Beetle in a box
- Bellum omnium contra omnes
- Big Book (ethics)
- Brain-in-a-vat (epistemology, philosophy of mind)
- Brainstorm machine
- Buridan's ass
- Changing places (reflexive monism, philosophy of mind)
- Chesterton's fence
- China brain (physicalism, philosophy of mind)
- Chinese room (philosophy of mind, artificial intelligence, cognitive science)
- Coherence (philosophical gambling strategy)
- Condillac's Statue (epistemology)
- Experience machine (ethics)
- Gettier problem (epistemology)
- Ḥayy ibn Yaqẓān (epistemology)
- Hilary Putnam's Twin Earth thought experiment in the philosophy of language and philosophy of mind
- If a tree falls in a forest
- Inverted spectrum
- Kavka's toxin puzzle
- Mary's room (philosophy of mind)
- Molyneux's Problem (admittedly, this oscillated between empirical and a-priori assessment)
- Newcomb's paradox
- Original position (politics)
- Philosophical zombie (philosophy of mind, artificial intelligence, cognitive science)
- Plank of Carneades
- Roko's basilisk
- Ship of Theseus, The (concept of identity)
- Shoemaker's "Time Without Change" (metaphysics)
- Simulated reality (philosophy, computer science, cognitive science)
- Social contract theories
- Survival lottery (ethics)
- Swamp man (personal identity, philosophy of mind)
- Teleportation (metaphysics)
- The transparent eyeball
- The violinist (ethics)
- Ticking time bomb scenario (ethics)
- Trolley problem (ethics)
- Utility monster (ethics)
- Zeno's paradoxes (classical Greek problems of the infinite)

=== Mathematics ===
- Balls and vase problem (infinity and cardinality)
- Gabriel's Horn (infinity)
- Hilbert's paradox of the Grand Hotel (infinity)
- Infinite monkey theorem (probability)
- Lottery paradox (probability)
- Sleeping beauty paradox (probability)

=== Biology ===
- Levinthal paradox
- Rotating locomotion in living systems

=== Computer science ===
- Braitenberg vehicles (robotics, neural control and sensing systems)
- Dining Philosophers
- Two Generals' Problem

=== Economics ===
- Broken window fallacy (law of unintended consequences, opportunity cost)
- Laffer Curve

== See also ==
- Alternate history
- Assume a can opener – Mocking catchphrase
- Aporia – State of puzzlement or expression of doubt, in philosophy and rhetoric
- Black box – System where only the inputs and outputs can be viewed, and not its implementation
- Brainstorm machine
- Ding an sich
- Einstein's thought experiments
- Futures studies
- Futures techniques
- Heuristic
- Intuition pump – Type of thought experiment
- Koan
- Mathematical proof
- Possible world
- Scenario planning
- Scenario test
- Theoretical physics

== Bibliography ==
- Adams, Scott, God's Debris: A Thought Experiment, Andrews McMeel Publishing, (USA), 2001
- Browning, K.A. (ed.), Nowcasting, Academic Press, (London), 1982.
- Buzzoni, M., Thought Experiment in the Natural Sciences, Koenigshausen+Neumann, Wuerzburg 2008
- Cohen, Martin, "Wittgenstein's Beetle and Other Classic Thought Experiments", Blackwell (Oxford) 2005
- Cohnitz, D., Gedankenexperimente in der Philosophie, Mentis Publ., (Paderborn, Germany), 2006.
- Craik, K.J.W., The Nature of Explanation, Cambridge University Press, (Cambridge), 1943.
- Cushing, J.T., Philosophical Concepts in Physics: The Historical Relation Between Philosophy and Scientific Theories, Cambridge University Press, (Cambridge), 1998.
- DePaul, M. & Ramsey, W. (eds.), Rethinking Intuition: The Psychology of Intuition and Its Role in Philosophical Inquiry, Rowman & Littlefield Publishers, (Lanham), 1998.
- Gendler, T.S. & Hawthorne, J., Conceivability and Possibility, Oxford University Press, (Oxford), 2002.
- Gendler, T.S., Thought Experiment: On the Powers and Limits of Imaginary Cases, Garland, (New York), 2000.
- Häggqvist, S., Thought Experiments in Philosophy, Almqvist & Wiksell International, (Stockholm), 1996.
- Hanson, N.R., Patterns of Discovery: An Inquiry into the Conceptual Foundations of Science, Cambridge University Press, (Cambridge), 1962.
- Harper, W.L., Stalnaker, R. & Pearce, G. (eds.), Ifs: Conditionals, Belief, Decision, Chance, and Time, D. Reidel Publishing Co., (Dordrecht), 1981.
- Hesse, M.B., Models and Analogies in Science, Sheed and Ward, (London), 1963.
- Holyoak, K.J. & Thagard, P., Mental Leaps: Analogy in Creative Thought, A Bradford Book, The MIT Press, (Cambridge), 1995.
- Horowitz, T. & Massey, G.J. (eds.), Thought Experiments in Science and Philosophy, Rowman & Littlefield, (Savage), 1991.
- Kahn, H., Thinking About the Unthinkable, Discus Books, (New York), 1971.
- Kuhne, U., Die Methode des Gedankenexperiments, Suhrkamp Publ., (Frankfurt/M, Germany), 2005.
- Leatherdale, W.H., The Role of Analogy, Model and Metaphor in Science, North-Holland Publishing Company, (Amsterdam), 1974.
- Ørsted, Hans Christian (1997). Selected Scientific Works of Hans Christian Ørsted. Princeton. ISBN 978-0-691-04334-0.. Translated to English by Karen Jelved, Andrew D. Jackson, and Ole Knudsen, (translators 1997).
- Roese, N.J. & Olson, J.M. (eds.), What Might Have Been: The Social Psychology of Counterfactual Thinking, Lawrence Erlbaum Associates, (Mahwah), 1995.
- Shanks, N. (ed.), Idealization IX: Idealization in Contemporary Physics (Poznan Studies in the Philosophy of the Sciences and the Humanities, Volume 63), Rodopi, (Amsterdam), 1998.
- Shick, T. & Vaugn, L., Doing Philosophy: An Introduction through Thought Experiments (Second Edition), McGraw Hill, (New York), 2003.
- Sorensen, R.A., Thought Experiments, Oxford University Press, (Oxford), 1992.
- Tetlock, P.E. & Belkin, A. (eds.), Counterfactual Thought Experiments in World Politics, Princeton University Press, (Princeton), 1996.
- Thomson, J.J. {Parent, W. (ed.)}, Rights, Restitution, and Risks: Essays in Moral Theory, Harvard University Press, (Cambridge), 1986.
- Vosniadou, S. & Ortony. A. (eds.), Similarity and Analogical Reasoning, Cambridge University Press, (Cambridge), 1989.
- Wilkes, K.V., Real People: Personal Identity without Thought Experiments, Oxford University Press, (Oxford), 1988.
- Yeates, L.B., Thought Experimentation: A Cognitive Approach, Graduate Diploma in Arts (By Research) Dissertation, University of New South Wales, 2004.
