= Lew Tucker =

American computer scientist (born 1950)

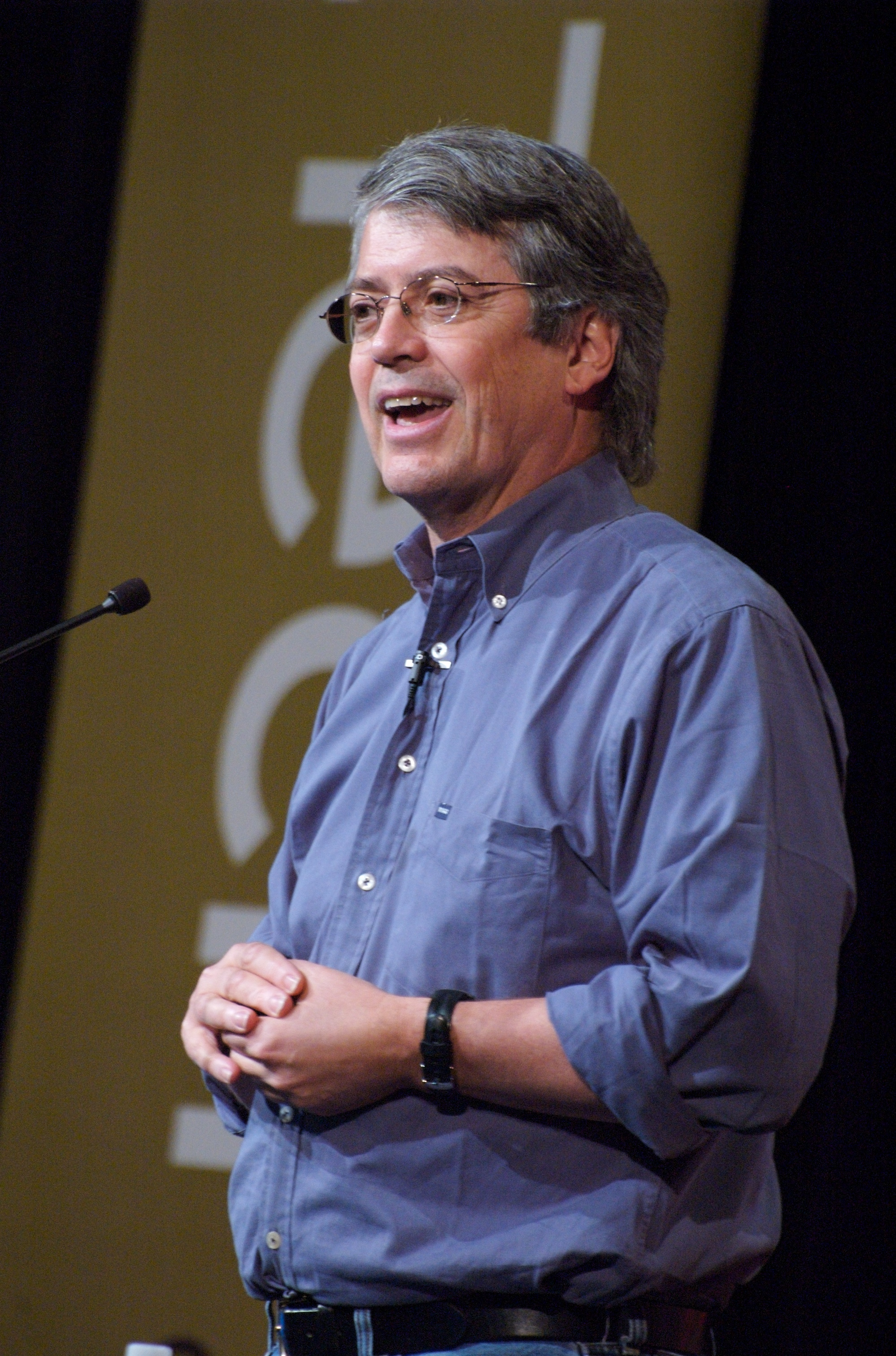
- Born: April 24, 1950 (age 76)
- Education: Cornell University (BS, 1972); Polytechnic Institute of New York (MS and Ph.D., 1984)
- Known for: Open source, Artificial intelligence, Parallel computing
- Title: VP/CTO, Cisco Systems; VP/CTO, Sun Microsystems; VP, Salesforce; Director, Thinking Machines
- Father: Tommy Tucker

Lewis Wiley Tucker (born April 24, 1950) is an American computer scientist, open source advocate, and industry executive spanning several decades of technology innovation. As an early proponent of internet technologies, he held executive-level positions at Sun Microsystems, Salesforce.com, and Cisco Systems contributing to the advancement of the Java programming language and platform, the AppExchange on-demand application marketplace, and the OpenStack cloud computing platform.

== Early life and education ==
The son of big band Leader Tommy Tucker, he grew up in the West Allenhurst section of Ocean Township, Monmouth County, New Jersey and attended the Peddie School in Hightstown, New Jersey for high school. He graduated from Cornell University with a B.A. in Biology and Ph.D. in Computer Science from Polytechnic Institute of New York.

== Career ==
Having interests in neurobiology and computer science, in 1976 Tucker started as a laboratory technician at the Laboratory of Neurobiology at Cornell University Medical College. He later become an assistant research scientist bringing computing to medical imaging and contributing to several research papers on neurogenic control of hypertension. He completed a Masters and Ph.D. in computer science from Polytechnic Institute of New York in 1984. His dissertation spanned both computer vision and parallel machine architectures for biomedical image analysis.

Upon completing his Ph.D., Tucker joined a new startup, Thinking Machines, in Cambridge, MA. Thinking Machines was founded by Daniel Hillis to develop technology for artificial intelligence using parallel computing. As research director for computer vision, Tucker contributed to the software and architecture of the Connection Machine, an early commercial massively parallel machine containing over 65,000 processors that was used by national laboratories working on supercomputing grand challenges.

In 1994 Thinking Machines was acquired by Sun Microsystems. Tucker joined Sun to lead an engineering team brought in from Thinking Machines in Chelmsford, MA. A year later, he moved to California as part of an initial team of developers and executives behind Java, a new programming language and platform designed for the emerging web. Tucker became Director of ISV Relations, evangelizing the use of Java technology by large corporations and startups alike. He was a frequent speaker on how the growing internet would become a force in the industry and was featured alongside other internet pioneers in "Digerati: encounters with the cyber elite". In 2000, at Sun Microsystems, Tucker became VP of Internet Services responsible for www.sun.com and java.sun.com.

In 2004, Tucker left Sun to join Salesforce.com where he created the AppExchange, one of the first online marketplaces for software-as-a-service applications. He left Salesforce.com to join Radar Networks, to advance a new semantic web platform, Twine.com, based on RDF.

With the emergence of Amazon’s Web Services (AWS) cloud platform, Tucker returned to Sun Microsystems in 2008 as Vice President and CTO to develop Sun’s platform for cloud computing. Just prior to launching Sun Cloud, the company was acquired by Oracle in 2010 shutting down the effort.

Tucker left to join Cisco Systems, Inc., as the company’s first VP and Chief Technology Officer for cloud computing. As Cloud CTO, Tucker moved Cisco into becoming a major contributor to the open-source developer community being built around OpenStack. He served as vice-chairman of the OpenStack Foundation, and board member of the Cloud Native Computing Foundation, and Cloud Foundry Foundation.

== Select articles and presentations ==
- Tucker, L.W., "OpenStack and the Power of Community-Developed Software", OpenStack Austin Summit, April 2016.
- Hillis, W. D., and L.W. Tucker, "The CM-5 Connection Machine: A scalable Supercomputer", Communications of the ACM, pp. 31–40, Nov. 1993.
- Tucker, L.W., "Data Parallelism: Image Understanding and the Connection Machine System", in "Parallel Architectures and Algorithms for Image Understanding, ed. V.P. Kumar, Academic Press, 1991.
- Tucker, L.W. and G. Robertson, "Architecture and Applications of the Connection Machine," IEEE Computer, pp 26–38, Aug. 1988.
- L. Tucker, C. Feynman and D. Fritzsche, "Object recognition using the Connection Machine," in Proceedings CVPR '88: The Computer Society Conference on Computer Vision and Pattern Recognition, Ann Arbor, MI, USA, 1988 pp. 871–878.
- Tucker, Lewis W. "Labeling connected components on a massively parallel tree machine." In Proc. IEEE Conf. Computer Vision and Pattern Recognition, pp. 124–129. 1986
- Tucker, Lewis W. "Control strategy for an expert vision system using quadtree refinement." In Proceedings of the IEEE workshop on Computer vision: Representation and control, Annapolis, MD, USA, pg, pp. 214–218. 1984.
