= David McNeill =

American psychologist and professor

- Born: 1933 (age 92–93); California, United States
- Education: A.B. and PhD in psychology, University of California, Berkeley, California, United States; Center for Cognitive Studies, Harvard University
- Known for: Scientific research into psycholinguistics; language, thought and gesture
- Scientific career
- Fields: Psychology
- Thesis: The Development of Paradigmatic Word-Associations under Experimental Conditions (1962)
- Doctoral advisor: Leo Postman
- Doctoral students: Justine Cassell

Glenn David McNeill (born 1933 in California, United States) is an American psychologist and writer specializing in scientific research into psycholinguistics and especially the relationship of language to thought, and the gestures that accompany discourse.

== Life and career ==
David McNeill is a professor of the University of Chicago in Illinois, and a writer.

=== Education ===
McNeill studied for and was awarded a Bachelor of Arts in 1953 and a Doctor of Philosophy in 1962, both in psychology, at the University of California, Berkeley. He went on to study at the Center for Cognitive Studies, Harvard University in 1963.

=== Academic positions held ===
- Harvard University, Research Fellow, Center for Cognitive Studies (1963–1965)
- University of Michigan, Assistant to associate professor of psychology (1965–1969)
- Harvard University, Visiting associate professor of psychology (1967–1969)
- University of Chicago, Professor of Psychology and Linguistics (1969–2001)
- Institute for Advanced Study, Princeton, Member (1973–1975)
- University of Chicago, Professor of Psychology and Linguistics Emeritus (2001–)
- Netherlands Institute for Advanced Study, Wassenaar, Fellow (1983–1984)
- Duke University, Department of Anthropology, Visiting Professor (1984)
- University of Chicago, chair, Department of Psychology (1991–1997)
- Max Planck Institute for Psycholinguistics, Nijmegen, Visitor (1998–1999)

=== Honors and awards ===
As well as being a member of Phi Beta Kappa and Sigma Xi and holding several academic fellowships including a Guggenheim Fellowship in 1973–1974, McNeill was Gustaf Stern Lecturer at the University of Gothenburg, Sweden in 1999; and Vice President of the International Society for Gesture Studies from 2002 to 2005.

In 1995, McNeill won the Award for Outstanding Faculty Achievement, University of Chicago; and in 1995 he was awarded the Gordon J. Laing Award from the University of Chicago Press for the book Hand and Mind.

In 2004, the National-Louis University (a multi-campus institution in Chicago) Office of Institutional Management Grants Center received an American Psychological Association Grant for Gale Stam Psychology College of Arts and Sciences to provide "a Festschrift conference honoring Professor David McNeill of the University of Chicago."

=== Research ===
McNeill specializes in psycholinguistics, and in particular scientific research into the relationship of language to thought, and the gestures that accompany discourse.

In his research, McNeill has studied videoed discourses of the same stimulus stories being retold "together with their co-occurring spontaneous gestures" by "speakers of different languages, [...] by non-native speakers at different stages of learning English, by children at various ages, by adolescent deaf children not exposed to language models, and by speakers with neurological impairments (aphasic, right hemisphere damaged, and split-brain patients)."

This and other research has formed the subject matter of a number of books which McNeill has written through his career.

== Research on the psychology of language and gesture ==
=== Central idea ===
The "growth point" is a key theoretical concept in McNeill's approach to psycholinguistics and is central to his work on gestures, specifically those spontaneous and unwitting hand movements that regularly accompany informal speech. The growth point, or GP, posits that gestures and speech are unified and need to be considered jointly. For McNeill, gestures are in effect (or, McNeill would say, in reality) the speaker's thought in action, and integral components of speech, not merely accompaniments or additions. Much evidence supports this idea, but its full implications have not always been recognized.

=== Growth Points and multi-modality ===
McNeill argues that thought is multimodal: both vocal-linguistic and manual-gestural, and the resulting semiotic opposition fuels change. In terms of semiotics, as a kind of sign, a gesture is "global" (in that the meanings of the "parts"—the hand shapes, space, direction, articulation–-depend in a top-down fashion on the meaning of the whole) and "synthetic" (in that several meanings are bundled into one gesture). Gestures, when they combine, do not form what Ferdinand de Saussure terms syntagmatic values; they paint a more elaborate picture but contain nothing corresponding to the emerging syntagmatic value of a noun as a direct object when combined with a verb ("hit the ball", where "ball", by itself, is not a direct object). Speech contrasts on each of these points: it is bottom-up, analytic and combinatoric.

=== Minimal units ===
Speech and gesture, taken together, comprise minimal units of human linguistic cognition. Following Lev Vygotsky in defining a "unit" as the smallest package that retains the quality of being a whole, in this case the whole of a gesture-language unity, McNeill calls the minimal psychological unit a Growth Point because it is meant to be the initial pulse of thinking-for-(and while)-speaking, out of which a dynamic process of organization emerges. The linguistic component of speech categorizes the visual and actional imagery of the gesture; the imagery of the gesture grounds the linguistic categories in a visual spatial frame.

=== Connections to phenomenology ===
McNeill employs the concept of "material carriers", a phrase used by Vygotsky to refer to the embodiment of meaning in enactments or material experiences to further develop the concepts of Mead's Loop and the GP. A material carrier enhances the symbolization's representational power. The concept implies that the gesture, "the actual motion of the gesture itself", is a dimension of meaning. This enhancement is possible if the gesture "is" the very image; not an "expression" or "representation" of it, but "it". From this viewpoint, a gesture is an image in its most developed: that is, its most materially, naturally embodied form. The absence of a gesture is the converse, an image in its least material form. The material carrier concept thus helps explain how an imagery-language dialectic can take place in absence of gesture. When no gesture occurs, there is still global-synthetic imagery in a dialectic with linguistic categorization, but we experience it at the "lowest level of materialization". It is not an alteration of the dialectic of its essentials-–the simultaneous rendering of meaning in opposite semiotic modes-–but a bleached version of it.

McNeill furthers this conception of the material carrier by turning to Maurice Merleau-Ponty for insight into the duality of gesture and language. Gesture, the instantaneous, global, nonconventional component, is "not an external accompaniment" of speech, which is the sequential, analytic, combinatoric component; it is not a "representation" of meaning, but instead meaning "inhabits" it. Merleau-Ponty links gesture and existential significance:

The link between the word and its living meaning is not an external accompaniment to intellectual processes, the meaning inhabits the word, and language 'is not an external accompaniment to intellectual processes'. We are therefore led to recognize a gestural or existential significance to speech. ... Language certainly has inner content, but this is not self-subsistent and self-conscious thought. What then does language express, if it does not express thoughts? It presents or rather it is the subject’s taking up of a position in the world of his meanings. [emphasis in the original]

For McNeill, the GP is a mechanism geared to this "existential significance" of speech, this "taking up a position in the world". Gesture, as part of the GP, is inhabited by the same "living meaning" that inhabits the word (and beyond, the whole of a discourse). A deeper answer to the query, therefore-–when we see a gesture, what are we seeing?--is that we see part of the speaker's current cognitive being, "her very mental existence", at the moment it occurs. This too is part of the origin of language by Mead's Loop (and explains the gestural leakage of lies. By performing the gesture, a core idea is brought into concrete existence and becomes part of the speaker's own existence at that moment. A gesture is not a representation, or is not only such: it is a form of being. From a first-person perspective, the gesture is part of the immediate existence of the speaker. Gestures (and words, etc., as well) are themselves thinking in one of its many forms, not only expressions of thought, "but thought, i.e., cognitive being, itself". To the speaker, gesture and speech are not only "messages" or communications, but are a way of cognitively existing, of cognitively being, at the moment of speaking.

To make a gesture, from this perspective, is to bring thought into existence on a concrete plane, just as writing out a word can have a similar effect. The greater the felt departure of the thought from the immediate context, the more likely is its materialization in a gesture, because of this contribution to being. Conversely, when "newsworthiness" is minimal materialization diminishes and in some cases disappears, even though a GP is active; in these cases gestures may cease while (empty) speech continues, or vice versa, speech ceases and a vague gesture takes place. Thus, gestures are more or less elaborated and GPs more or less materialized depending on the importance of material realization to the "existence" of the thought.

=== Language origin and Mead’s Loop ===
In terms of the origin of language, the GP "predicts" (of the remote past) that whatever evolved led to a GP system of semiotic oppositions. This provides an empirical test of all theories on the origin of language: Can the theory in question explain the observed speech-gesture-thought unity of human cognition? The widely popular "gesture-first" theory, according to which language began as pure gesture without speech, fails this test. In fact, it fails it twice, predicting what did not evolve (that speech supplanted gesture) and not predicting what did evolve (our own speech-gesture unity). An alternative, which McNeill calls "Mead's Loop" after the philosopher George Herbert Mead, explains this unity. It too claims that gesture was essential to the origin of language, but not because it was "primitive" or more accessible. Rather, it says that speech could not have evolved without gesture; neither could gesture have evolved without speech. Speech and gesture originated together, at the same time, in response to the same selection pressures.

=== Natural selection ===
Mead's Loop and the mirror neuron "twist" would be naturally selected in scenarios where sensing one's own actions as social is advantageous. For example, in imparting information to infants, where it gives the adult the sense of being an instructor as opposed to being just a doer with an onlooker, as is the case with chimpanzees. Entire cultural practices of childrearing depend upon this sense. Self-awareness as an agent is necessary for this advantage to take hold. For Mead's Loop to have been selected the adult must be sensitive to her own gestures as social actions.

The link between the GP and self-aware agency also appears in children's language development, which can be linked to the origin of language in a version of the long-dismissed "ontogeny recapitulates phylogeny" hypothesis of recapitulation theory. McNeill considers that when something emerges in current-day ontogenesis only at a certain stage of development, the original natural selection of the feature (if there was any) might have taken place in a similar psychological milieu in phylogenesis. This opens a window onto the mindset of the creature in which the Mead's Loop "twist" was evolving. As a mode of reasoning, it exploits the fact that children's intellectual status is not fixed but changing. Thus, McNeill argues, we look for new states that seem pegged to steps in the ontogenesis of GPs and Mead's Loop underlying them, and consider these steps as possible signals from ancient phylogenesis. Evidence shows that self-aware agency could be such a signal. The GP emerges around age 3 or 4 years, which is also about when children first become aware of themselves as agents, since before that age the speech and gestures of children have “...the character of 'sharing' experiences with the other rather than of 'communicating' messages to the Other", as put by Heinz Werner and Bernard Kaplan in their 1963 book, Symbol Formation. The theory of mind (which is really awareness of other perspectives) also emerges about this time, and likewise depends on self-aware agency.

== Reception ==
McNeill's books have received coverage in a number of academic journals and in the general press.

A 1991 article in the Chicago Reader; a 2006 article in the Scientific American, Mind magazine; and a 2008 article in Boston Globe describe McNeill's work on the language of gesture in detail.

The Acquisition of Language was reviewed in the International Journal of Language & Communication Disorders in 1971.

The Conceptual Basis of Language was reviewed in The Conceptual Basis of Language in 1980.

Hand and Mind was reviewed in Language and Speech; the American Journal of Psychology; and Language in 1994.

Gesture and Thought was reviewed in Language in Society and Metaphor and Symbol in 2007.

== Selected publications ==
=== Books written ===
- McNeill, David (1970). The Acquisition of Language: The Study of Developmental Psycholinguistics. New York, US: Harper & Row. ISBN 0-06-044379-0. (Paperback)
- McNeill, David (October 1979). The Conceptual Basis of Language. New Jersey, US: Erlbaum / John Wiley & Sons Inc. ISBN 0-470-26663-5. (Hardcover)
- McNeill, David (February 1987). Psycholinguistics: A New Approach. New York, USA; United Kingdom: Harper & Row / HarperCollins College Div. ISBN 0-06-044387-1. (Paperback).
- McNeill, David (15 January 1996). Hand and Mind: What Gestures Reveal about Thought. Chicago, Illinois, US: University of Chicago Press. ISBN 0-226-56134-8. (Paperback)
- McNeill, David (8 November 2005). Gesture and Thought. Chicago, Illinois, US: University of Chicago Press. ISBN 0-226-51462-5. (Hardcover)
- McNeill, David (30 August 2012). How Language Began: Gesture and Speech in Human Evolution. New York, USA; United Kingdom: Cambridge University Press. ISBN 978-1-107-60549-7. (Hardcover)
- McNeill, David (7 March 2016). Why We Gesture: The Surprising Role of Hand Movements in Communication. New York, USA; United Kingdom: Cambridge University Press. ISBN 978-1-107-13718-9. (Hardcover)
- McNeill, David (2025). Language Is Gesture. MIT Press. ISBN 9780262383899.

=== Books edited ===
- McNeill, David, ed. (August 2000). Language and Gesture (Language Culture and Cognition). Cambridge, England: Cambridge University Press. ISBN 0-521-77166-8. (Hardcover, paperback ISBN 0-521-77761-5)

== Reviews of McNeill's work ==
- Unknown (October 1971). "Book Reviews: The Acquisition of Language: The Study of Developmental Psycholinguistics. David McNeill". International Journal of Language & Communication Disorders. 6 (2). Royal College of Speech & Language Therapists: 177–183. doi:10.3109/13682827109011546.
- Unknown (September 1980). "Book Reviews: The Conceptual Basis of Language By David McNeill (1979)". International Journal of Language & Communication Disorders. 15 (2). Royal College of Speech & Language Therapists: 143–153. doi:10.3109/13682828009011380.
- Henderson, Harold (24 October 1991). "More Than Words Can Say: The Language of Gestures, as Translated by U. of C. Psycholinguist David McNeill". Chicago Reader.
- Studdert-Kennedy, Michael (1994). "Hand and Mind: What Gestures Reveal About Thought". Language and Speech. 37 (2). SAGE Publications: 203–209. doi:10.1177/002383099403700208. S2CID 13569413.
- Feyereisen, Pierre (Spring 1994). "Book Reviews: Hand and Mind: What Gestures Reveal about Thought by David McNeill". The American Journal of Psychology. 107 (1). University of Illinois Press: 149–155. doi:10.2307/1423299. JSTOR 1423299.
- Fischer, Susan D. (June 1994). "Reviews: Hand and Mind: What Gestures Reveal about Thought by David McNeill". Language. 70 (2). Linguistic Society of America: 345–350. doi:10.2307/415833. JSTOR 415833.
- Segrin, Chris (2002). "Book Reviews". Journal of Language and Social Psychology. 21 (2). SAGE Publications: 181–183. doi:10.1177/0261927X02021002008. S2CID 220358514.
- Wachsmuth, Ipke (October 2006). "Gestures Offer Insight". Scientific American, Mind.
- Monaghan, Leila (2007). "Book Reviews: Dave McNeill, Gesture and Thought". Language in Society. 36 (5). Cambridge University Press: 764–768. doi:10.1017/S0047404507070704. S2CID 144259303.
- Mittelberg, Irene (June 2007). "Gesture & Thought. David McNeill, Chicago: Chicago University Press, 2005". Metaphor and Symbol. 22 (3). Psychology Press, Taylor & Francis Group: 281–290. doi:10.1080/10926480701357711. S2CID 144499900.
- Bennett, Drake (4 May 2008). "Hand power". Boston Globe. Archived from the original on 20 May 2008.
