= Wachsmuth =

Wachsmuth is a German surname. Notable people with the surname include:

- Charles Wachsmuth (1829–1896), American paleontologist
- Curt Wachsmuth (1837–1905), German historian and classical philologist
- Ipke Wachsmuth (born 1950), German computer scientist
- Toni Wachsmuth (born 1986), German footballer
