= It's a Hit =

It's a Hit may refer to:

- "It's a Hit" (song), a song by Rilo Kiley
- It's a Hit (TV series), a 1957 American children's show
