= Andrew Kemendo =

Andrew Kemendo is an American artificial intelligence researcher and technology executive who is known for founding Pair, a Maryland-based augmented reality company that developed markerless mobile AR tools.

== Early life and education ==
Kemendo received a Bachelor of Science in econometrics and quantitative economics from the United States Air Force Academy. He later studied at the National Intelligence University. Kemendo is a veteran of the Iraq War.

== Career ==
Kemendo was commissioned as an officer in the United States Air Force in 2008 and later worked in technical operations at the Defense Intelligence Agency. During an assignment involving construction projects in Guam, he developed a prototype application for visualizing computer-aided design models on-site, which he later commercialized as an augmented reality product.

In 2012, Kemendo founded Visidraft, a Hyattsville, Maryland-based augmented reality company that developed markerless mobile AR tools to visualize 3D CAD designs on iOS devices. The company raised seed financing in April 2015, led by Hivers & Strivers. Following the American Institute of Architects conference in 2015, the company expanded toward consumer applications and was renamed as Pair in September 2015. Pair was acquired by Manor in 2019.

After selling Pair, Kemendo joined Kessel Run, a United States Air Force software development unit based at Hanscom Air Force Base in Massachusetts. He served as chief data officer, co-leading the Data product category responsible for the dataONE library and related infrastructure, and later became chief technology officer.

In 2023, Kemendo joined Gambit, a Los Angeles-based dual-use defense company developing software for unmanned aerial, ground, and marine autonomous systems, where he later became chief technology officer (CTO). Gambit emerged from stealth mode in January 2026.

== Research ==
Kemendo's research interests include artificial general intelligence, computer vision, AI explainability, and the theoretical foundations of intelligence. He served on an IEEE working group developing standards for ethical AI from 2017 to 2020 and on the advisory board of Purdue University's College of Engineering from 2017 to 2021. He is a co-editor of the Springer proceedings of the 19th International Conference on Artificial General Intelligence (AGI 2026), held in San Francisco in July 2026, through his work with the AGI Society.
