= CardoO =

Egyptian Internet of Things brand

CardoO (founded in 2018) is an Egyptian Internet of Things (IoT) brand, based in Cairo, Egypt.

== History ==
CardoO, an Egyptian startup, founded by Ahmed Adel in 2018, released its first smartwatch with Internet of Things (IoT) capability.

The company offers MENA consumers access to consumer electronics and IoT devices.

The IoT mobile app from CardoO enables an AI system and offers intelligent scenarios.

In 2023, CardoO, attended GITEX Africa 2023.
