= Bottlenose =

Bottlenose may refer to:

== Cetacea ==
- Bottlenose dolphin, the genus Tursiops
- Bottlenose whale, the genus Hyperoodon
- Lagenorhynchus, a genus of dolphins

== Fish ==
- Mormyrus caschive, the Eastern bottlenose
- Bottlenose skate, Rostroraja alba
- Rhynchobatus australiae, bottlenose wedgefish

== Other ==
- Bottlenose (company), a trend intelligence company

== See also ==
- The Battersea Bottlenose, a juvenile northern bottlenose whale found in the River Thames in 2006
