= Graham Nicholls =

British author (born 1975)

- Born: Graham Nicholls; 30 July 1975 (age 50); London, England
- Occupations: Author, speaker and artist
- Years active: Since 1999
- Known for: His exploration of the out-of-body experience, Installation art and writings on spirituality.
- Website: www.grahamnicholls.com

Graham Nicholls (born 30 July 1975) is a British author, installation artist and specialist on out of body experiences. He speaks widely on parapsychology, ethics and art at institutions ranging from the London Science Museum, The Society for Psychical Research to the Cambridge Union Society.

== Early life ==
Graham Nicholls was born in the Paddington district of central London into a working-class family. He states that during his early life he was surrounded by crime and social problems, but that the influence of literature, art, science and spiritual philosophies helped him to look beyond the limitations of this environment.

== Art career ==
Since the early 1990s Nicholls has developed artistic works that explore subjects such as sensory deprivation, hypnosis, and psi abilities. Nicholls had his first solo show at a gallery run by James Fuentes in New York City in July 1999 and in 2004 developed many of his psychological ideas into an interactive virtual reality installation called The Living Image. The installation was a collaboration between Graham Nicholls, 3D designer Roma Patel, and site-specific artist Trudi Entwistle at London's Science Museum, much of which was based upon Nicholls's life and locations from his childhood. The project was the subject of an academic study into the impact of virtual reality and installation art, the details of which were later published in two books dealing with scenography and performance. Technology and science, such as that used in The Living Image project, take a central role in his artistic output, his virtual web projects being considered internationally recognised by the Handbook of the economics of art and culture.

== Out-of-body experiences ==
Nicholls claims to have had out of body experiences (OBEs) since the age of approximately twelve years old. These experiences led him to study many aspects of parapsychology. In 2009 Nicholls outlined his experiences and ideas relating to OBEs in an article that appeared in Kindred Spirit magazine. In the article he makes it clear that he believes mainstream science will eventually fully embrace psi, or psychical perceptions as natural, rather than supernatural or paranormal.

As part of his inquiry into psi and human consciousness, in 2009 he began working on a series of telepathy experiments in a joint project with controversial scientist Rupert Sheldrake. The resulting data formed part of Rupert Sheldrake's research as director of the Perrott-Warrick project, administered by Trinity College, Cambridge.

=== Veridical cases ===
Nicholls also claims to have had several veridical out-of-body experiences. In his books, articles and in recent videos published he gives examples of his out-of-body experiences that have been witnessed and confirmed by others. The videos feature the witnesses describing what they saw and recorded in notes at the time of the OBEs supporting Nicholls version of events. He also outlines an example of a claimed objective OBE in his October 2011 article for the journal of The Institute of Noetic Sciences. Skeptics would generally dispute such claims as unreliable and impossible by current understandings of science.

=== Skepticism ===
In the October 2012 issue of The Psychologist, the journal of the British Psychological Society, a review of Navigating the Out-of-Body Experience by Graham Nicholls, criticised him for failing "to take into account psychometric properties (e.g. reliability and validity)" in the questionnaire section of the book. The reviewer went on to state that the book "does not meet the standards required by professional psychologists".

Well known sceptic and critic of parapsychology James Randi also responded to an article about Nicholls that appeared in 2011 asking why those mentioned in the article, including Dean Radin, Rupert Sheldrake, Michael Persinger, and Graham Nicholls have not applied for the One Million Dollar Paranormal Challenge. Nicholls penned a response to Randi expressing doubts towards Randi's honesty, scientific credibility, and the limits of a single test to explore issues such as the existence of OBEs.

== Activism ==
In 2004 Nicholls founded an organisation called the Shahmai Network with a special focus on work towards relieving poverty, as well as human rights. The network were official members of the Make Poverty History campaign focused on campaigning for debt relief to countries in situations of extreme poverty, this culminated with protests aimed to influence the G8 conference, which took place in 2005.

Beyond poverty he is also interested in the various social justice issues. According to a 2012 book on polyamory, Nicholls supports LGBT issues, polyamory, and feminism. In 2009 he founded www.polyamory.org.uk, the United Kingdom's first website about polyamory; at the time he was in a polyamorous triad with two female partners.

He is also an outspoken supporter of animal rights and veganism; in a recent interview he states that he has been vegetarian since 1992 and went vegan in 2005. He also states that "Veganism was the obvious next step in my ethical understanding and one that avoids supporting violent and exploitative practices."

== Books ==
- Avenues of the Human Spirit (2011) ISBN 978-1-84694-464-2
- Navigating the Out-of-Body Experience: Radical New Techniques (2012) ISBN 978-0-7387-2761-5
