= Nova Spivack =

American businessman

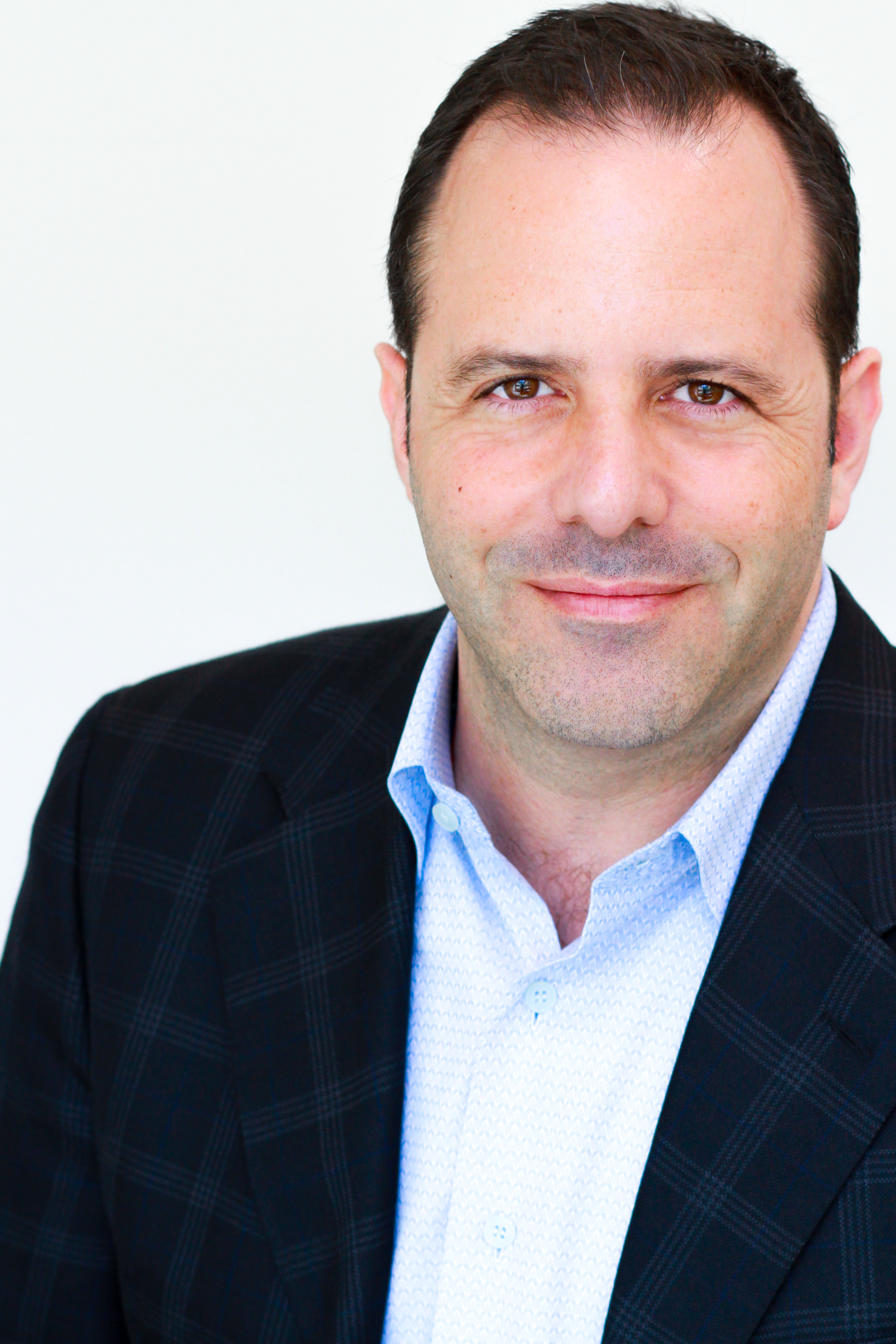
- Born: Boston, Massachusetts, United States
- Education: Oberlin College
- Occupations: Entrepreneur, venture capitalist, author
- Partner: Kimberly Rubin
- Parent(s): Mayer Spivack, Kathleen Spivack (Drucker)

Nova Spivack is an American entrepreneur, venture capitalist, and author. He is the founder and CEO of the early stage science and technology incubator Magical and co-founder of The Arch Mission Foundation.

Spivack previously co-founded Bottlenose; EarthWeb; Radar Networks; The Daily Dot; and Live Matrix. He has invested in companies such as Klout, Sensentia, PublishThis, Next IT, and is a venture partner in Rewired. He is also an advisor for EES Ventures, and is on the board of directors of the Common Crawl Foundation.

== Early life and education ==
Nova Spivack was born in Boston and grew up in Watertown, Massachusetts. He was admitted early to the University of Massachusetts Boston and attended while still in high school. In 1989, he participated in summer research at MIT and took part in a study of parallel computing techniques for research on chaos- and complexity theory focused on Cellular Automata. He studied philosophy at Oberlin College with focus on artificial intelligence and cognitive science, and graduated with a bachelor's degree in 1991. Spivack attended International Space University in 1992. He majored in Space Life Sciences, and also worked on ISU’s space humanities program. His studies at ISU were funded by NASA and the ESA. While at ISU, he also worked in Japan on a project to build an international solar power satellite system. Spivack later trained with the Russian Air Force in reduced-gravity parabolic flight and flew to edge of space with Space Adventures in 1999.

== Career ==
=== Early career ===
In the late 1980s, while a college student, Spivack developed software for Kurzweil Computer Products and later at Thinking Machines. In 1993, Spivack worked at Individual, Inc., a venture that developed intelligent software to filter news sources. Nova Spivack co-founded EarthWeb, a website that provided career development resources and technical information to IT professionals, in 1994. While at EarthWeb, Spivack helped establishments including AT&T, Sony, The Metropolitan Museum of Art, BMG Music Club, and the New York Stock Exchange launch their first large-scale Web operations. EarthWeb's successfully executed an initial public offering in November 1998. At the time, EarthWeb's first-day return was among the largest in NASDAQ history and helped recapture dwindling investor interest in new equity offerings from Internet-based companies.

=== 2000–2009 ===
From 1999–2000, Spivack helped co-found and build nVention Convergence Ventures, an in-house intellectual property incubator of SRI International and Sarnoff Laboratories. While consulting to nVention, Spivack founded two companies of his own: business incubator Lucid Ventures in 2001 and technology venture Radar Networks in 2003. Radar Networks invented technologies based on Semantic Web standards that the company also licensed to CALO, an SRI project funded by DARPA. Spivack raised initial outside venture funding for Radar Networks in April 2006.

Radar Networks introduced its first commercial product Twine, a Semantic Web-based tool for information storage, authoring and discovery, in 2008.

In 2009, Spivack became the first investor in Klout.com, a website and mobile app that measures social influence.

=== 2010–present ===
Spivack and Sanjay Reddy launched Live Matrix.

Spivack co-founded Bottlenose in 2010 with Dominiek ter Heide.

Spivack co-founded The Daily Dot in August 2011. Spivack serves as a patron for the Commercial Spaceflight Federation. He is also a member of the Education and Awareness Council of For All Moonkind, Inc.

In 2015, Spivack co-founded The Arch Mission Foundation. Through the Arch Mission Foundation, Spivack curated the first permanent space library, which contained Isaac Asimov's Foundation Trilogy contained on a quartz disk aboard Elon Musk's Tesla Roadster that was sent to space aboard the SpaceX Heavy Falcon rocket in 2018. In 2019, the Arch Mission sent the Lunar Library, a 30 million page library of books, data, images and a copy of English Wikipedia to the Moon. Spivack says the Arch Mission and Lunar Library were inspired by an early childhood dream of his of the future. In 2021, Spivack announced partnerships with Astrobotic Technology and Galactic Legacy Labs for several return missions to the Moon such as a second attempt to deliver the Lunar Library and for consumers to land their personal memories and photos on the Moon.

Spivack is also the founder and CEO of Magical Corporation, a science and technology venture studio.

== Authorship ==
Spivack is considered a leading pioneer in semantic web technology. Spivack has authored approximately 100 granted and pending patents. He writes about the future of the Internet and topics concerning search, social media, personalization, information filtering, entrepreneurship, and Web technology and applications. Spivack has been interviewed by TechCrunch, Live Science, Space.com and other publications regarding the development of data storage for use in space missions and the preservation of earth's civilization.

== Personal life ==
Spivack is the grandson of management theorist Peter F. Drucker. He is married to Kimberly Rubin-Spivack. His parents are poet Kathleen Spivack and inventor Mayer Spivack.
