= Amy Arnell =

American singer

Amy Arnell (January 12, 1915 - January 20, 1980) was an American singer, best known for her work with Tommy Tucker and his orchestra.

== Early years ==
Arnell was born in Roanoke, Virginia, and raised in Portsmouth, Virginia. As early as age 3, she would sit on a piano and sing while her mother played. She attended Woodrow Wilson High School and the College of William & Mary and gained singing experience in her church choir and on radio stations.

Before she made a career of singing, she worked as a secretary.

== Career ==
Arnell caught the attention of Tucker when he heard her sing while he and his band were in Portsmouth. She auditioned for him and was hired. Later, her recording of "I Don't Want to Set the World on Fire" with the Tucker orchestra "became a smash hit", selling half a million records for Columbia. The recording's success boosted the band from cheaper one-night stands "into the higher brackets." Arnell also appeared with Tucker and his orchestra in the short film It's Tommy Tucker Time (1943), which was part of the RKO Pictures Jamboree Series. The short was reissued in 1947.

Arnell debuted on radio in Detroit on Phil Baker's program, and in 1937-1938 she sang with Tucker's orchestra on George Jessel's Thirty Minutes in Hollywood program. In 1939–1940, she appeared with Tucker and his orchestra on Pot o' Gold. In December 1945, she joined the cast of The Abbott and Costello Show, replacing vocalist Connie Haines.

On December 7, 1943, Arnell left Tucker to do a solo act, performing at theaters. A review in the trade publication Variety in December 1943 evaluated her performance with the comment, "Lacking a voice and with averaged delivery and looks, she scores mildly here."

== Other activities ==
Arnell was half-owner of a florist shop in Hollywood.

== Personal life and death ==
In late 1949, Arnell married Kurt H. Scharff, with whom she had two sons. She died on January 20, 1980 from heart failure after a long battle with breast cancer.
