= Roth, North Dakota =

- Unincorporated community
- Location of Roth, North Dakota
- Coordinates: 48°54′28″N 100°48′10″W
- Country: United States
- State: North Dakota
- County: Bottineau County

Area
  - Total: 0.0052 sq mi (.0134 km^{2})
  - Land: 0.0052 sq mi (.0134 km^{2})
  - Water: 0 sq mi (0 km^{2})
- Elevation: 1,503 ft (458 m)
- Time zone: UTC-6 (Central (CST))
  - Summer (DST): UTC-5 (CDT)
- ZIP Code: 58783
- Area code: 701
- FIPS code: 38-68620
- GNIS feature ID: 1031010

Roth is an unincorporated community in Bottineau County in the U.S. state of North Dakota. It is located roughly 6 miles (9.7 km) to the west of Souris. Roth does not have a post office, but it shares the zip code of 58783 with Souris.

== History ==
Roth was first founded in 1904 as Faldet (or Faldot) as a station on the Great Northern Railway and renamed Roth in 1905 after Martin Rothe, a railroad official. It was originally intended to be named Carbury, which is a town roughly 12 miles (19 km) to the east. However, due to a mix up by railroad officials or the Secretary of State, depending on who tells the story, the townsite names were accidentally switched when the wrong signs were posted. The mistake was never corrected.

Roth's post office was established on May 22, 1907, this time with the name Hewitt. The name was corrected to Roth in 1908 when the new postmaster John W. Reep noticed the mistake. The post office closed on August 14, 1964, with the mail service now included in the zip code of 58783 which is based at Souris.

== Geography ==
Roth is located in the Souris River Valley. The city of Souris is to the east.

== Demographics ==
Roth is part of Scandia Township, which showed a population of 50 as of the 2020 census. As an unincorporated community, the United States Census Bureau does not track separate population numbers for Roth. However, according to census block data, Roth coincides with block 1091 of census tract 9254, block group 1. This block recorded a combined population of 5 in a total of 3 households during the 2000 census.
