= Carbury, North Dakota =

- Unincorporated community
- Location of Carbury, North Dakota
- Coordinates: 48°53′27″N 100°32′41″W
- Country: United States
- State: North Dakota
- County: Bottineau County
- Township: Pickering
- Founded: 1901
- Elevation: 1,660 ft (510 m)

Population (1980)
  - Total: 5
- Time zone: UTC-6 (Central (CST))
  - Summer (DST): UTC-5 (CDT)
- ZIP Code: 58783
- Area code: 701
- FIPS code: 38-12140
- GNIS feature ID: 1028276

Carbury is an unincorporated community in Bottineau County in the U.S. state of North Dakota. It is located along North Dakota Highway 14 in the eastern part of the county, east of Souris. The town is virtually abandoned, and the 2000 census did not record a population. The post office closed in 1984, and it is now part of zip code 58783 covered by the post office in Souris.

Carbury is also designated by the U.S. Customs and Border Protection agency as a port of entry between the United States and Canada.

== History ==
Carbury is named after the village of Carbury in County Kildare, Ireland. Founded in 1901 as a station on the Great Northern Railway, the post office first opened April 16, 1906. Though the town has been known as Carbury since its founding, it was originally intended to be named Roth, which is a town roughly 12 miles (19 km) to the west. However, due to a mixup by railroad officials or the Secretary of State, depending on who tells the story, the townsite names were accidentally switched when the wrong signs were posted. The mistake was never corrected. Carbury's original post office was assigned the zip code 58724. The post office closed in 1984, and mail service was merged with Souris, North Dakota.

The town experienced a top population of 50 in 1920, which had dwindled to 5 by 1980.

Norwegian settlers from Polk County, Minnesota, established a settlement near Carbury in 1883, reportedly becoming the first Norwegians in Bottineau County.

== Geography ==
Carbury is part of Pickering Township in the Souris River Valley. It is approximately 10 miles (16 km) to the northwest of the county seat of Bottineau and roughly 7 miles (11 km) to the southeast of Souris.

Carbury Dam located 1 mile (1.6 km) south of town is a public fishing area managed by the North Dakota Game and Fish Department.

== See also ==
- Carbury–Goodlands Border Crossing
