= Conference on Artificial General Intelligence =

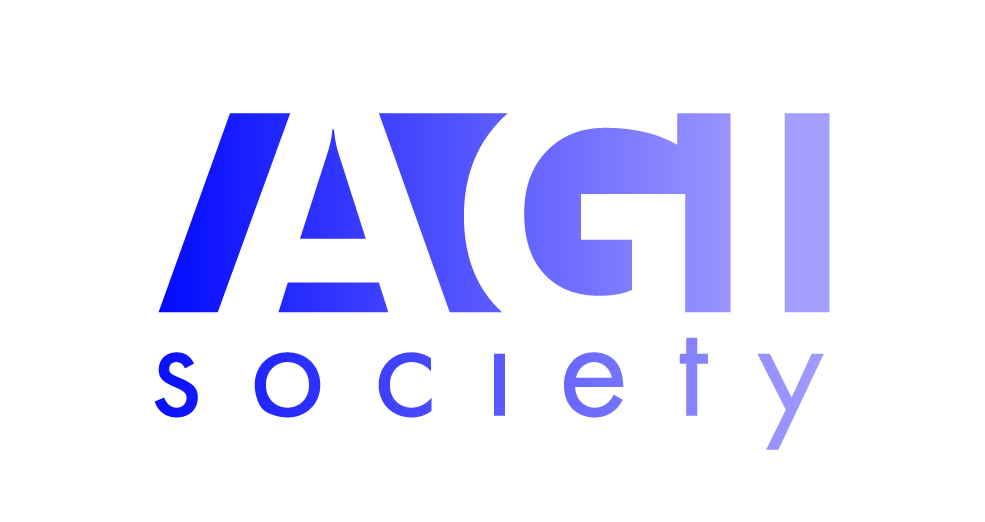
- Abbreviation: AGI
- Discipline: Artificial general intelligence

Publication details
- Publisher: Springer Nature
- History: 2008-present
- Frequency: Annual
- Website: https://agi-conference.org/

The Conference on Artificial General Intelligence (AGI) is a meeting of researchers in the field of artificial general intelligence (AGI) organized by the AGI Society steered by Marcus Hutter and Ben Goertzel. It has been held annually since 2008. The conference was initiated by the 2006 Bethesda Artificial General Intelligence Workshop and has since been hosted at various international venues.

== AGI Society ==
The conference is organized by the Artificial General Intelligence Society (AGI Society), a United States nonprofit organization dedicated to promoting the study and development of AGI. Registered as a nonprofit in the U.S. state of Delaware in September 2011, the Society serves as an institutional guardian for the pursuit of general machine intelligence, operating independently of corporate AI commercialization. Funding for the society's activities and the conference series relies partially on decentralized support, including digital asset donations from the independent developer community.

As of 2026, the Society is chaired by Ben Goertzel, with Pei Wang serving as vice chair, Joscha Bach as secretary, and Matt Iklé as treasurer. Its board of directors comprises researchers from across the AGI spectrum, including Itamar Arel, Marcus Hutter, Moshe Looks, and Kristinn R. Thórisson.

=== Journal of Artificial General Intelligence ===
In addition to organizing the conference, the AGI Society owns and publishes the Journal of Artificial General Intelligence (JAGI), a peer-reviewed open-access journal devoted to research on AGI. The journal began publication in December 2009 and is edited by Pei Wang of Temple University.

== Locations and history ==
- (United States) AGI-2026 San Francisco State University, California, USA
- AGI-2025 Reykjavík University, Reykjavík, Iceland
- (United States) AGI-2024 University of Washington, Seattle, Washington, USA
- AGI-2023 KTH Royal Institute of Technology, Stockholm, Sweden
- (United States) AGI-2022 The Crocodile, Seattle, Washington, USA
- (United States) AGI-2021 Computer History Museum, Mountain View, California, USA
- (United States) AGI-2020 Virtual Conference
- AGI-2019 Sheraton Shenzhen Futian, Shenzhen, China
- AGI-2018 Czech Technical University, Prague, Czech Republic
- AGI-2017 ibis Melbourne, Melbourne, Australia
- (United States) AGI-2016 The New School, New York, New York, USA
- AGI-2015 Berlin-Brandenburg Academy of Sciences and Humanities, Berlin, Germany
- AGI-2014 Université Laval, Quebec City, Canada (sponsored by the Cognitive Science Society and the AAAI)
- AGI-2013 Peking University, Beijing, China (sponsored by the Cognitive Science Society and the AAAI)
- AGI-2012 University of Oxford, Oxford, United Kingdom (sponsored by the Future of Humanity Institute and Ray Kurzweil)
- (United States) AGI-2011 Google Headquarters, Mountain View, California, USA (sponsored by Google, AAAI, and Ray Kurzweil)
- AGI-2010 University of Lugano, Lugano, Switzerland (In Memoriam Ray Solomonoff and sponsored by AAAI and Ray Kurzweil)
- (United States) AGI-2009 Crowne Plaza Crystal City, Arlington, Virginia, USA (sponsored by AAAI and Ray Kurzweil)
- (United States) AGI-2008 University of Memphis, Tennessee, USA (sponsored by AAAI)

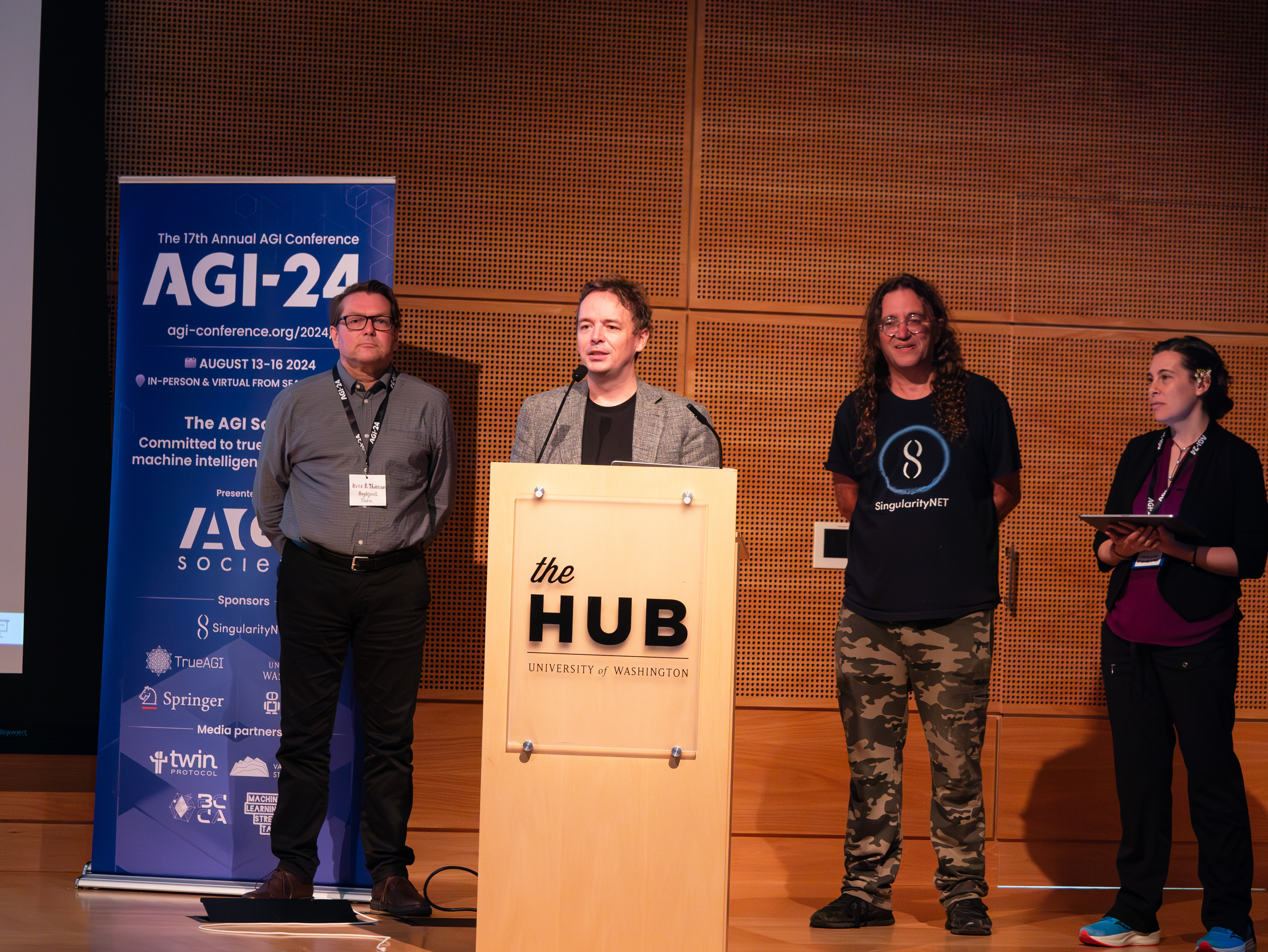
Kristinn R. Thórisson, Joscha Bach, Ben Goertzel, and Haley Lowy on stage at AGI-2024

== Notable speakers ==
The conference has attracted many speakers over the years including Turing Award winners Yoshua Bengio and Richard S. Sutton as well as Ben Goertzel, Marcus Hutter, Jürgen Schmidhuber, Gary Marcus, John E. Laird, Peter Norvig, Joscha Bach, François Chollet, John L. Pollock, Bill Hibbard, Hugo de Garis, Stan Franklin, Steve Omohundro, Randal A. Koene, Ernst Dickmanns, Margaret Boden, David Hanson, Roman Yampolskly, Selmer Bringsjord, Kristinn R. Thórisson and Nick Bostrom.
