= Psi-theory =

Psychology theory

Psi-theory, developed by Dietrich Dörner at the University of Bamberg, is a systemic psychological theory covering human action regulation, intention selection and emotion. It models the human mind as an information processing agent, controlled by a set of basic physiological, social and cognitive drives. The theory suggests that perceptual and cognitive processing are directed and modulated by these drives, which allow the autonomous establishment and pursuit of goals in an open environment.

Next to the motivational and emotional system, Psi-theory suggests a neuro-symbolic model of representation, which encodes semantic relationships in a hierarchical spreading activation network. The representations are grounded in sensors and actuators, and are acquired by autonomous exploration.

== Main assumptions ==
The concepts of Psi-theory may be reduced to a set of basic assumptions. Psi-theory describes a cognitive system as a structure consisting of relationships and dependencies that is designed to maintain a homeostatic balance in the face of a dynamic environment.

=== Representation ===
Psi-theory suggests hierarchical networks of nodes as a universal mode of representation for declarative, procedural and tacit knowledge. These nodes may encode localist and distributed representations. The activity of the system is modeled using modulated and directional spreading of activation within these networks.

Plans, episodes, situations and objects are described with a semantic network formalism that relies on a fixed number of pre-defined link types, which especially encode causal/sequential ordering, and partonomic hierarchies (the theory specifies four basic link-types). Special nodes (representing neural circuits) control the spread of activation and the forming of temporary or permanent associations and their dissociations.

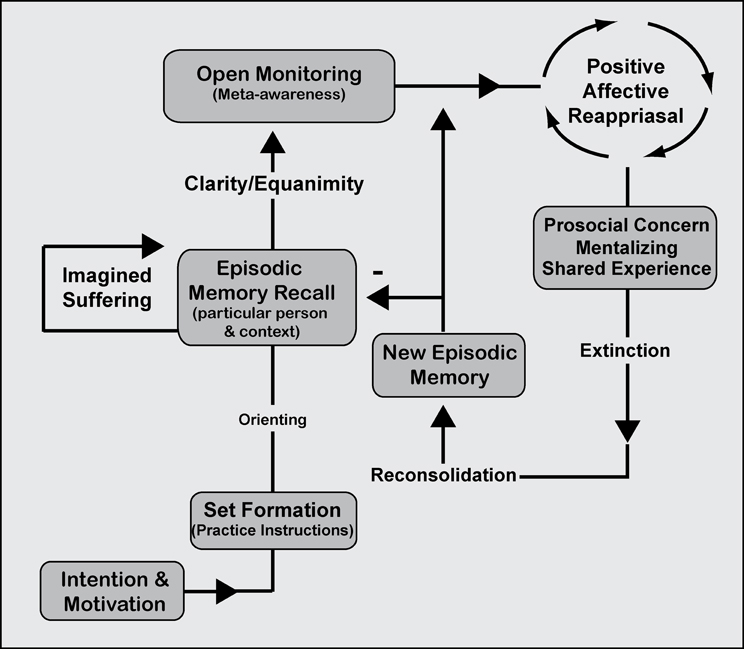
How the episodic memory works.

=== Memory ===
At any time, the Psi agent possesses a world model (situation image). This is extrapolated into a branching expectation horizon (consisting of anticipated developments and active plans). In addition, the working memory also contains a hypothetical world model that is used for comparisons during recognition, and for planning.

The situation image is gradually transferred into an episodic memory (protocol). By selective decay and reinforcement, portions of this long-term memory provide automated behavioral routines, and elements for plans (procedural memory).

The atoms of plans and behavior sequences are triplets of a (partial, hierarchical) situation description, forming a condition, an operator (a hierarchical action description) and an expected outcome of the operation as another (partial, hierarchical) situation description. Object descriptions (mainly declarative) are also part of long-term memory and the product of perceptual processes and affordances. Situations and operators in long-term memory may be associated with motivational relevance, which is instrumental in retrieval and reinforcement. Operations on memory content are subject to emotional modulation.

=== Perception ===
Perception is based on conceptual hypotheses, which guide the recognition of objects, situations and episodes. Hypothesis based perception ("HyPercept") is understood as a bottom-up (data-driven and context-dependent) cuing of hypotheses that is interleaved with a top-down verification. The acquisition of schematic hierarchical descriptions and their gradual adaptation and revision can be described as assimilation and accommodation.

Hypothesis based perception is a universal principle that applies to visual perception, auditory perception, discourse interpretation and even memory interpretation. Perception is subject to emotional modulation.

=== Drives ===
The activity of the system is directed towards the satisfaction of a finite set of primary, pre-defined drives (or urges). All goals are situations that are associated (by learning) with the satisfaction of an urge, or situations that are instrumental in achieving such a situation (this also includes abstract problem solving, aesthetics, the maintenance of social relationships and altruistic behavior). These urges reflect demands of the system: a mismatch between a target value of a demand and the current value results in an urge signal, which is proportional to the deviation, and which might give rise to a motive.

There are three categories of drives:

1. Physiological drives (such as food, water, maintenance of physical integrity), which are relieved by the consumption of matching resources and increased by the metabolic processes of the system, or inflicted damage (integrity).
2. Social drives (affiliation). The demand for affiliation is an individual variable and adjusted through early experiences. It needs to be satisfied in regular intervals by external legitimacy signals (provided by other agents as a signal of acceptance and/or gratification) or internal legitimacy signals (created by the fulfillment of social norms). It is increased by social frustration (anti-legitimacy signals) or supplicative signals (demands of other agents for help, which create both a suffering by frustration of the affiliation urge, and a promise of gratification).
3. Cognitive drives (reduction of uncertainty, and competence). Uncertainty reduction is maintained through exploration and frustrated by mismatches with expectations and/or failures to create anticipations. Competence consists of task specific competence (and can be acquired through exploration of a task domain) and general competence (which measures the ability to fulfill the demands in general). The competence drive is frustrated by actual and anticipated failures to reach a goal. The cognitive drives are subject to individual variability and need regular satisfaction.

Changes in systemic demands are reflected in a "pleasure" or "distress signal", which is used as for reinforcement learning of associations between demands and goals, as well as episodic sequences and behavior scripts leading up to these goals.

=== Cognitive modulation and emotion ===
Cognitive processing is subject to global modulatory parameters, which adjust the cognitive resources of the system to the environmental and internal situation. These modulators control behavioral tendencies (action readiness via general activation or arousal), stability of active behaviors/chosen goals (selection threshold), the rate of orientation behavior (sampling rate or securing threshold) and the width and depth of activation spreading in perceptual processing, memory retrieval and planning (activation and resolution level). The effect and the range of modulator values are subject to individual variance.

Emotion is not understood as an independent sub-system, a module or a parameter set, but an intrinsic aspect of cognition. Emotion is an emergent property of the modulation of perception, behavior and cognitive processing, and it can therefore not be understood outside the context of cognition. To model emotion, we need a cognitive system that can be modulated to adapt its use of processing resources and behavior tendencies.

In the Psi-theory, emotions are interpreted as a configurational setting of the cognitive modulators along with the pleasure/distress dimension and the assessment of the cognitive urges. The phenomenological qualities of emotion are due to the effect of modulatory settings on perception and cognitive functioning (i.e. the perception yields different representations of memory, self and environment depending on the modulation), and to the experience of accompanying physical sensations that result from the effects of the particular modulator settings on the physiology of the system (for instance, by changing the muscular tension, the digestive functions, blood pressure and so on). The experience of emotion as such (i.e. as having an emotion) requires reflective capabilities. Undergoing a modulation is a necessary, but not a sufficient condition of experiencing it as an emotion.

=== Motivation ===
Motives are combinations of drives and a goal. Goals are represented by a situation that affords the satisfaction of the corresponding urge. Several motives may be active at a time, but only one is chosen to determine the choice of behaviors of the agent. The choice of the dominant motive depends on the anticipated probability of satisfying the associated urge and the strength of the urge signal. (This means also that the agent may opportunistically satisfy another urge if presented with that option.)

The stability of the dominant motive against other active motivations is regulated using the selection threshold parameter, which depends on the urgency of the demand and individual variance.

=== Learning ===
Perceptual learning comprises the assimilation/accommodation of new/existing schemas by hypothesis based perception. Procedural learning depends on reinforcing the associations of actions and preconditions (situations that afford these actions) with appetitive or aversive goals, which is triggered by pleasure and distress signals. Abstractions may be learned by evaluating and reorganizing episodic and declarative descriptions to generalize and fill in missing interpretations (this facilitates the organization of knowledge according to conceptual frames and scripts).

Behavior sequences and object/situation representations are strengthened by use. Tacit knowledge (especially sensory-motor capabilities) may be acquired by neural learning.

Unused associations decay, if their strength is below a certain threshold: highly relevant knowledge may not be forgotten, while spurious associations tend to disappear.

=== Problem solving ===
Problem solving is directed towards finding a path between a given situation and a goal situation, on completing or reorganizing mental representations (for instance, the identification of relationships between situations or of missing features in a situational frame) or serves an exploratory goal.

Problem solving is organized in stages: If no immediate response to a problem is found, the system first attempts to resort to a behavioral routine (automatism), and if this is not successful, it attempts to construct a plan. If planning fails, the system resorts to exploration (or switches to another motive). Problem solving is context dependent (contextual priming is served by associative pre-activation of mental content) and subject to modulation.

The strategies that encompass problem solving are parsimonious. They can be reflected upon and reorganized according to learning and experience. Many advanced problem solving strategies can not be adequately modeled without assuming linguistic capabilities.

=== Language and consciousness ===
Language has to be explained as syntactically organized symbols that designate conceptual representations, and a model of language thus starts with a model of mental representation. Language extends cognition by affording the categorical organization of concepts and by aiding in meta-cognition. (Cognition is not interpreted an extension of language by the Psi-theory.)

The understanding of discourse may be modeled along the principles of hypothesis based perception and assimilation/accommodation of schematic representations. Consciousness is related to the abstraction of a concept of self over experiences and protocols of the system and the integration of that concept with sensory experience; there is no explanatory gap between conscious experience and a computational model of cognition.

== Evaluation ==
Evaluating the Psi-theory in an experimental paradigm is difficult, not least because of the many free variables it posits. The predictions and propositions of the Psi-theory are mostly qualitative. Where quantitative statements are made, for instance about the rate of decay of the associations in episodic memory, the width and depth of activation spreading during memory retrieval, these statements are rarely supported by experimental evidence; they represent ad hoc solutions to engineering requirements posed by the design of a problem solving and learning agent.

A partial exception to this rule is the emotional model, which has been tested as a set of computational simulation experiments. While it contains many free variables that determine the settings of modulator parameters and the response to motive pressures, it can be fitted to human subjects in behavioral experiments and thereby demonstrate similar performance in an experimental setting as different personality types. The parameter set can also be fitted to an environment by an evolutionary simulation; the free parameters of the emotional and motivational model allow a reproduction of personal variances.

The Psi-theory can also be interpreted as a specification for a cognitive architecture.

== MicroPsi architecture ==
MicroPsi is a cognitive architecture built by Joscha Bach at the Humboldt University of Berlin and the Institute of Cognitive Science of the University of Osnabrück. MicroPsi extends the representations of the Psi-theory with taxonomies, inheritance and linguistic labeling; MicroPsi's spreading activation networks allow for neural learning, planning and associative retrieval.

MicroPsi's first generation (2003–2009) is implemented in Java, and includes a framework for editing and simulating software agents using spreading activation networks, and a graphics engine for visualization. MicroPsi has also been used as a robot control architecture.

MicroPsi 2 is a new implementation of MicroPsi, written in Python, and currently used as a tool for knowledge representation.

== OpenCog ==
The OpenCog cognitive architecture includes a simple implementation of Psi-theory, dubbed OpenPsi. It includes interfaces to Hanson Robotics robots for emotion modelling.

== Literature ==
- Dietrich Dörner: Bauplan für eine Seele. Rowohlt, 1999, ISBN 978-3-498-012885 (in German).
- Dietrich Dörner, Christina Bartl, Frank Detje, Jürgen Gerdes, Dorothée Halcour, Harald Schaub, Ulrike Starker: Die Mechanik des Seelenwagens. Eine neuronale Theorie der Handlungsregulation. Verlag Hans Huber, 2002, ISBN 3-456-83814-X (in German).
- Dietrich Dörner & C. Dominik Güss, (2013). PSI: A computational architecture of cognition, motivation, and emotion. Review of General Psychology, 17, 297–317.
- Joscha Bach: Principles of Synthetic Intelligence. PSI: An Architecture of Motivated Cognition. Oxford University Press, 2009, ISBN 978-0-195-370676.
