= West Allenhurst, New Jersey =

Place in Monmouth County, New Jersey, United States

- Unincorporated community
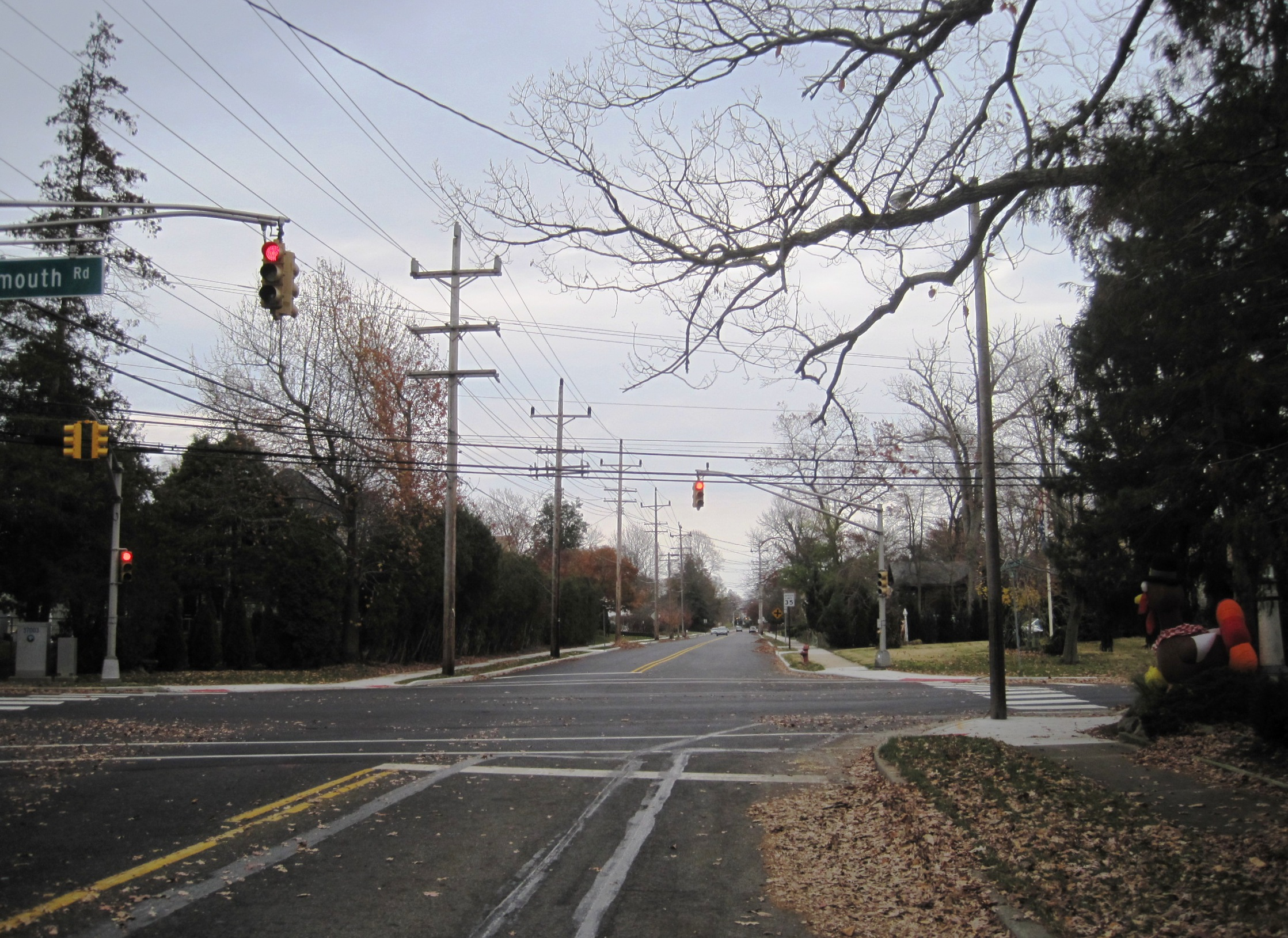
- At the intersection of Corlies Avenue and Monmouth Road (CR 15)

- Location within Monmouth County, New Jersey Location within New Jersey Location within the United States
- Coordinates: 40°14′18″N 74°00′42″W
- Country: United States
- State: New Jersey
- County: Monmouth
- Township: Ocean
- Elevation: 16 ft (4.9 m)
- Time zone: UTC-5 (Eastern (EST))
  - Summer (DST): UTC-4 (EDT)
- GNIS feature ID: 881673

West Allenhurst is an unincorporated community located within Ocean Township in Monmouth County, New Jersey, United States. The area is served as United States Postal Service ZIP code 07711. As of the 2000 United States census, the population for ZIP Code Tabulation Area 07711 was 1,934. West Allenhurst is bordered by Allenhurst to the east, Deal to the northeast, and Interlaken to the south. Major arterial roads in the community are the east-west Corlies Avenue (which leads directly to NJ Transit's North Jersey Coast Line Allenhurst station) and the north-south Monmouth Road (County Route 15).

== Notable people ==
People who were born in, residents of, or otherwise closely associated with West Allenhurst include:

- Gloria Monty (1921–2006), television producer best known for her work in the field of soap operas, most notably her tenure at General Hospital.
- Richard R. Stout (1912–1986), politician who served in the New Jersey Senate from 1952 to 1974.
- Lew Tucker (born 1950), computer scientist, open source advocate and industry executive
- Tommy Tucker (1903–1989), bandleader best known for "I Don't Want to Set the World on Fire".
