= Carbury–Goodlands Border Crossing =

Canada–United States border crossing

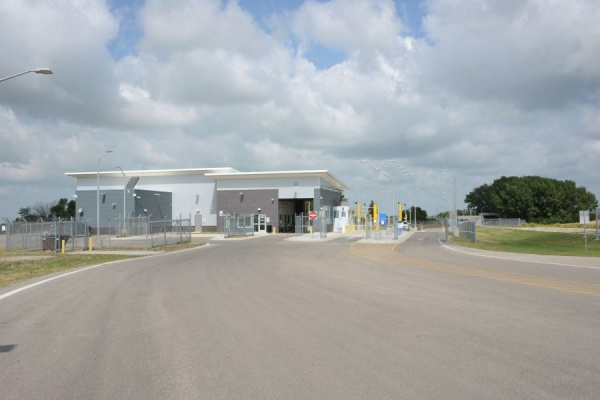
- US Border Inspection Station at Carbury, North Dakota

Locaiton
- Country: United States; Canada
- Location: ND 14 / PTH 21; US Port: 10919 Hwy 14 NE, Souris, North Dakota 58783; Canadian Port: Manitoba Highway 21, Deloraine, Manitoba R0M 0M0
- Coordinates: 48°59′58″N 100°33′20″W

Details
- Opened: 1932

Website
- US Canadian

The Carbury–Goodlands Border Crossing connects the towns of Souris, North Dakota, and Deloraine, Manitoba, on the Canada–United States border. North Dakota Highway 14 on the American side joins Manitoba Highway 21 on the Canadian side.

== Canadian side ==
Deloraine, which had a customs presence from 1889, served as the frontier office. In 1932, the function was moved to the border, adopting the name of Goodlands, the nearest post office. That year, a residence and office accommodation were erected. Canada replaced the 1970s-era Goodlands border station in 2014. In 2020, the former border hours of 8am–10pm reduced, becoming 9am–5pm.

== US side ==
The settlement of Carbury, North Dakota has virtually vanished. The border station built in 1963 was replaced in 2011. The border was previously open until 10 pm.

== See also ==
- List of Canada–United States border crossings
