= Justine Cassell =

American linguist, professor and human-computer interaction researcher

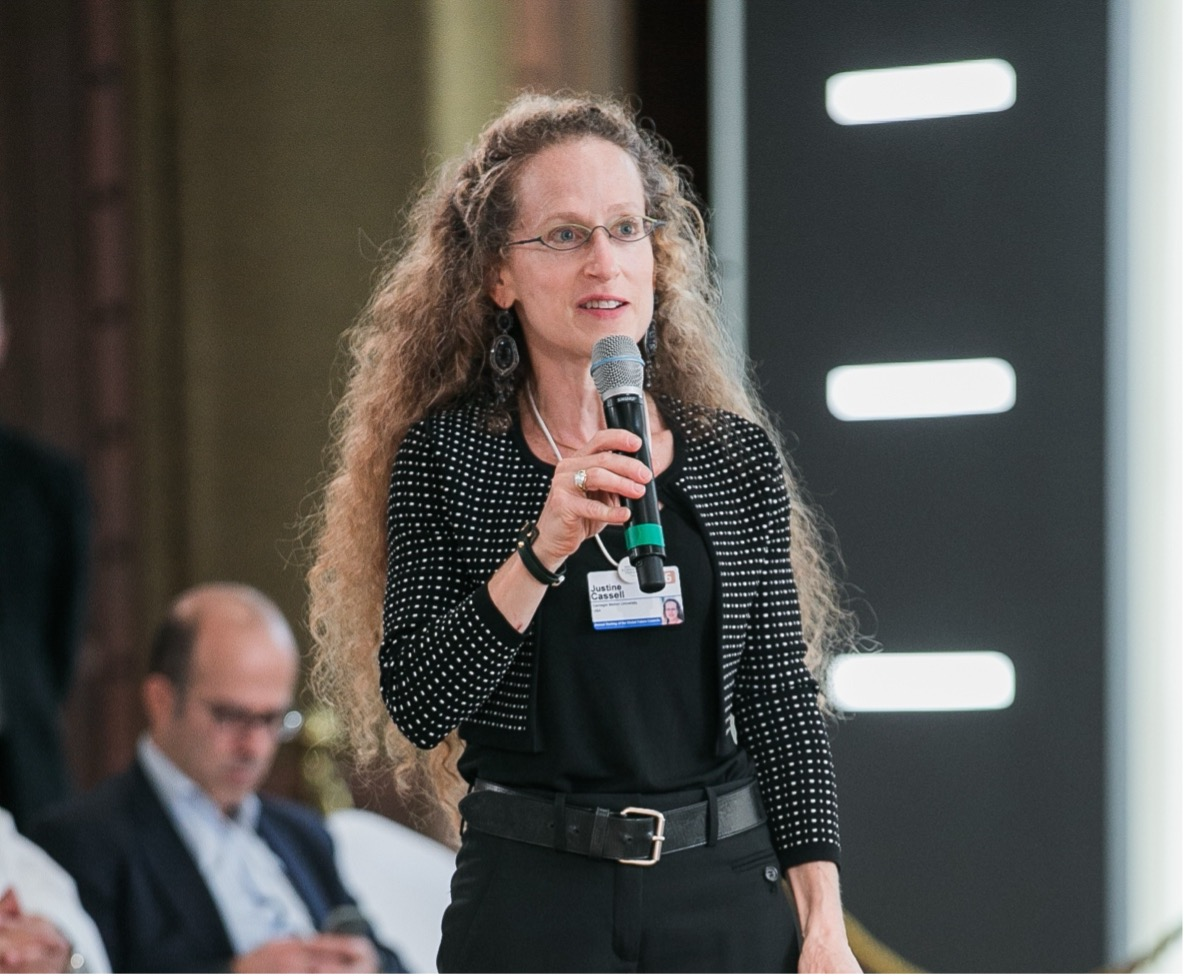
- Cassell at WEF in 2016.
- Citizenship: United States; France
- Education: Université de Besançon; Dartmouth College; University of Edinburgh; University of Chicago
- Scientific career
- Fields: Linguistics; Artificial Intelligence; Human-Computer Interaction
- Workplaces: Northwestern University; MIT; Carnegie Mellon University
- Thesis: The Development of the Expression of Time and Event in Narrative (1991)
- Doctoral advisor: David McNeill
- Doctoral students: Kristinn R. Thórisson

Justine M. Cassell is an American-born French professor and researcher interested in the nature of collaboration and conversation, between people, and between people and artificial intelligence agents. Since August 2010, she has been on the faculty of the Carnegie Mellon Human Computer Interaction Institute (HCII) and the Language Technologies Institute, with courtesy appointments in Psychology, linguistics and the Center for Neural Bases of Cognition. Cassell has served as the director of the HCII, as associate vice-provost, and as Associate Dean of Technology Strategy and Impact for the School of Computer Science. Since 2019, Cassell has divided her time between Carnegie Mellon, where she now holds the Dean's Professorship in Language Technologies, and PRAIRIE, the Paris Institute on Interdisciplinary Research in AI, where she also holds the position of senior researcher at Inria.

== Early life and education ==
Cassell holds a DEUG in Lettres Modernes from the Université de Besançon (1981), a BA in Comparative Literature/Linguistics from Dartmouth College (1982), an M.LITT. in Linguistics from the University of Edinburgh (1986), and a double PhD in Linguistics and Developmental/Cognitive Psychology from the University of Chicago (1991) where she studied under David McNeill.

== Career ==
Cassell’s first faculty position after graduate school was at Penn. State University, where she was jointly appointed in Linguistics, Psychology and French. She then spent a year as visiting faculty in the department of Computer and Information Science at the University of Pennsylvania, and moved from there to the MIT Media Lab, where she got tenure in 2001. After leaving MIT, she became a full professor in the departments of Electrical Engineering and Computer Science, and Communication Studies at Northwestern University. There she was the founding director of the Technology and Social Behavior Ph.D. program, and the interdisciplinary Center for Technology and Social Behavior. She joined Carnegie Mellon University as the chair of the Human Computer Interaction Institute in 2010.

== Honors and awards ==
In 2001, Cassell received the Edgerton Faculty Award at MIT; in 2008 she received the Anita Borg Institute Women of Vision Award for Leadership; in 2009 Cassell was made an ACM Distinguished Lecturer. In 2012, she was named a AAAS Fellow and in 2016 was named both a Royal Society of Edinburgh Fellow and ACM Fellow. In 2018, Cassell was awarded the Henry and Bryna David prize for social science applicable to public policy, and in 2023 was awarded an honorary doctorate by the University of Edinburgh. In between, her work has been awarded a number of best paper prizes, and a "test of time" award, and has received various other kinds of accolades.In 2025, she was named a Fellow of the International Academy of Artificial Intelligence Sciences (AAIS).

Cassell has authored more than 150 journal articles, articles in conference proceedings and book chapters on these topics; she has given more than 60 keynote addresses at various conferences, and more than 200 other invited talks at workshops, symposia, universities, and industry research labs.

== Research ==
Cassell's early work involved verbal and nonverbal aspects of human communication, into which she began introducing computational systems in order to deconstruct the linguistic and nonverbal communication to allow machines to interact with humans. Randal Bryant, Dean of Carnegie Mellon's School of Computer Science, commented on her appointment to the directorship of the Human Computer Interaction Institute that she would "expand the horizons of the institute."The Institute studies how people communicate with and through technology.Cassell is credited with developing the Embodied Conversational Agent (ECA), the first conversational agent with a body: an animated human figure that integrates gesture, facial expression and intonation to interact with people. Subsequently, she developed a "virtual child," that has helped children with autism develop advanced social skills in ways that in some respects surpassed those taught by association with real children or teachers.

In other work, Cassell directed the first international online community for young people in 1998. Called the Junior Summit, it gathered more than 3000 young people aged 10 to 16, from 139 different countries. Cassell has opined that "The Internet is not diminishing community activity, but simply transferring it to online communities. Young people who use them are getting just as much practice in leadership and social skills and community involvement as they did before the Internet." Cassell has commented frequently in media on topics related to children and technology.

In parallel, Cassell has carried out research on girls and women in technology. She designed a web-based storytelling system called "Renga, the Cyberstory" to help draw girls into new technology. During 1994-1995 she designed and coordinated workshops on survival skills for women in academia at the University of Pennsylvania and the Linguistic Society of America Summer Institute in Linguistics. She also has worked on research into what constitutes a "normal" career path in linguistics for women.

In 1998 Cassell co-edited and co-wrote a volume called From Barbie to Mortal Kombat: Gender and Computer Games with Henry Jenkins. A New York Times reviewer described the book as an "academic anthology about what women, or rather girls, want from computer games." He writes that they "wisely" ask "why there have to be 'girl games' at all. After all, many games with tremendous appeal to women have no gender affiliation." 20 years later From Barbie to Mortal Kombat is still in press. Commenting on why women were not more involved in computing careers, Cassell has commented that the creation of girls' games had not eliminated "the sense among both boys and girls that computers were 'boys' toys' and that true girls didn't play with computers." Additionally, she has written that women do not necessarily want to be identified as a "nerd" or "geek." Cassell contributed to a 2011 New York Times debate on "Where Are the Women in Wikipedia?" writing: "...Wikipedia may feel like a fight to get one's voice heard. One gets a sense of this insider view from looking at the 'talk page' of many articles, which rather than seeming like collaborations around the construction of knowledge, are full of descriptions of 'edit-warring' — where successive editors try to cancel each other's contributions out — and bitter, contentious arguments about the accuracy of conflicting points of view...However, it is still the case in American society that debate, contention, and vigorous defense of one's position is often still seen as a male stance, and women's use of these speech styles can call forth negative evaluations."

More recently, Cassell has built "socially-aware" conversational agents, capable of recognizing and engaging in rapport-building behaviors with people. In 2017 her team was invited to build an example of this work, the Socially Aware Robot Assistant (SARA) for World Economic Forum attendees to interact – the first live demonstration of AI technology in the Davos Congress Center.

As of January 2024, Cassell has been invited to speak about Artificial Intelligence at the World Economic Forum meetings in Davos 9 times. In 2011 she was named to the World Economic Forum Global Agenda Council on Robotics and Smart Devices, which she then chaired. She currently serves as a member of their expert forum.

== Press ==
Cassell has been featured in international media, including radio, television, and print outlets, discussing her work in artificial intelligence and human-computer interaction.

- "Les machines ont-elles un sexe ?". France Culture. 2022.
- "IA : la linguiste qui fait parler les machines". Les Échos. 2024.
- "Intelligence artificielle et éducation". Franceinfo. 2025.

A partial list can also be found on her website

== Bibliography ==
- Gesture and the dynamic dimension of language: essays in honor of David McNeill, with David McNeill, Susan D. Duncan, Elena Terry Levy, John Benjamins Publishing Company, 2007
- Embodied Conversational Agents, MIT Press, 2000. First book ever published describing embodied conversational agents.
- From Barbie to Mortal Kombat: Gender and Computer Games, MIT Press, 1998.

== See also ==
- Embodied conversational agent

== Interviews ==
Cassell has been interviewed by various media outlets in the United States and France. Notable recent interviews include:

- "Témoignage de talent – Justine Cassell", Choose Paris Region, s.d.
- "Pourquoi les assistants virtuels ont besoin d’un corps ?", CNRS Le Journal, s.d.
- "Can Black English Help Black Children Learn Better? One Educator Believes So", The Hechinger Report, 2024.
- "Justine Cassell – François Taddei : penseurs hors de la boîte !", Philosophie Magazine, s.d.
- "Les créatures artificielles affirment leur personnalité", Le Monde, 2002.
- "Spotlight on Justine Cassell", ELLIS, 2023.
- "Intervention de Justine Cassell à l’occasion de la sortie de Civilisation numérique. Ouvrons le débat !", Conseil national du numérique, 2021.
- "IA/AI : Aujourd’hui nous assistons à l’avènement de l’intelligence artificielle générative…", ApprofonLire, 2024.
- "Nous ne savons pas comment les IA trouvent les solutions qu’elles nous proposent", La Dépêche, entretien, 2023.
