= Pickering Township, Bottineau County, North Dakota =

Pickering Township Township of Pickering
- Township
- Location of Pickering Township in Bottineau County
- Coordinates: 48°53′00″N 100°32′02″W
- Country: United States
- State: North Dakota
- County: Bottineau
- Organized: circa 1920

Area
  - Total: 35.57 sq mi (92.1 km^{2})
  - Land: 35.56 sq mi (92.1 km^{2})
  - Water: 0.01 sq mi (0.026 km^{2})
- Elevation: 1,627 ft (496 m)

Population (2010 census)
  - Total: 193
  - Density: 5.43/sq mi (2.10/km^{2})
- Time zone: UTC-6 (Central (CST))
  - Summer (DST): UTC-5 (CDT)
- Area code: 701
- FIPS code: 38-62300
- GNIS feature ID: 1759290

Pickering Township is a civil township in Bottineau County in the U.S. state of North Dakota. Its population was 193 as of the 2010 census, down from 213 at the 2000 census.

== History ==
Pickering Township was organized sometime between 1910 and 1920 from Vinge School Township and the western portion of Bottineau School Township.

Reportedly, in 1883, Norwegian settlers from Polk County, Minnesota, established the first Norwegian settlement in Bottineau County near Carbury in present-day Pickering Township. Other Norwegians followed in 1886.

== Geography ==
Pickering Township is located in Township 162N, Range 76W. North Dakota Highway 14 is a primary highway in the township, and the city of Bottineau, which is the county seat, is located in the southeast corner of the township.

According to the 2010 United States census, the township has a total area of 35.570 square miles (92.13 km^{2}), of which 35.557 square miles (92.09 km^{2}) is land and 0.013 square miles (0.03 km^{2}) is water.

Carbury Dam is a public fishing area located 1 mile (1.6 km) south and 1 mile (1.6 km) west of Carbury. It is managed by the North Dakota Game and Fish Department.
