= Edward L. Garden =

American politician (1873–1936)

Member of the North Dakota Senate from the 28th district
- In office 1911–1914

Member of the North Dakota House of Representatives from the 28th district
- In office 1907–1910

Personal details
- Born: Edward Lorenzio Garden; November 30, 1873 Decorah, Iowa, U.S.
- Died: 1936 (aged 62–63)
- Party: Republican
- Education: Decorah Institute
- Profession: Politician

Edward Lorenzio Garden (November 30, 1873 – 1936) was an American politician from Souris, North Dakota who served in both chambers of the North Dakota Legislature, representing the 28th legislative district of North Dakota as a Republican. He served in the North Dakota House of Representatives from 1907 to 1910 and the North Dakota Senate from 1911 to 1914.

== Early life and education ==
Garden was born in Decorah, Iowa, on November 30, 1873. He received his education at the Decorah Institute.

== Career ==
In 1899, Garden moved to North Dakota, where he worked as a hardware and furniture merchant, operating stores in Landa, Lansford, and Souris.

Prior to serving in the North Dakota Legislature, Garden served as vice president of the North Dakota Hardware Dealers Association and president of the Souris Commercial Club.

Garden served two terms in the North Dakota House of Representatives from 1907 to 1910, representing the 28th legislative district of North Dakota as a Republican.

In 1910, Garden was elected to one term in the North Dakota Senate. He served in this chamber from 1911 to 1914.

== Personal life and death ==
Garden was married. He died in 1936.

North Dakota House of Representatives
Preceded by —	Member of the North Dakota House of Representatives from the 28th district 1907–1910	Succeeded by —
North Dakota Senate
Preceded by —	Member of the North Dakota Senate from the 28th district 1911–1914	Succeeded by —
