= It's a Hit (TV series) =

- Presented by: Happy Felton
- Country of origin: United States
- Original language: English

Production
- Running time: 30 minutes

Original release
- Network: CBS

It's a Hit is an American children's show that aired on CBS on Saturday mornings from June 1, 1957 to September 21, 1957. The show was hosted by Happy Felton.

== Summary ==
The show combined baseball and a quiz in which two teams of children were coached by sports figures to answer questions about what they were learning in school. Examples of sports figures are Harvey Kuenn (Detroit Tigers) and Bobby Shantz (Philadelphia Athletics).
