= Tommy Tucker (bandleader) =

American bandleader (1903–1989)

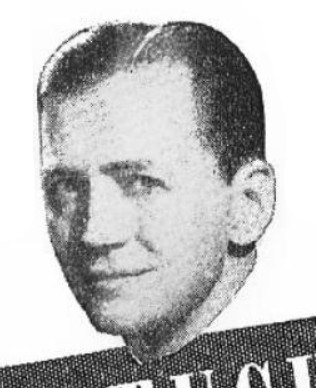

Background information
- Born: Gerald L. Duppler; May 18, 1903; Souris, North Dakota, United States
- Died: July 11, 1989 (aged 86) Sarasota, Florida, U.S.
- Genres: Big band, jazz
- Occupations: Bandleader, music professor
- Instruments: Piano, accordion, trombone

Gerald L. Duppler (May 18, 1903 – July 11, 1989), better known under his stage name Tommy Tucker, was an American bandleader.

The Tommy Tucker Orchestra entertained many listeners as a big band in the 1930s and 1940s. Popular as a dance band, the Tucker orchestra played concert halls, theatres, hotels and various venues across the country—for a span of 25 years. Recorded for Okeh in June 1941, his biggest hit, "I Don't Want to Set the World on Fire", achieved status as a Gold Record. Tucker wrote his own theme song, "I Love You (Oh, How I Love You)"; it was published on four record labels, including Brunswick, in 1935, and MGM in 1951.

Many listeners were familiar with the Tucker orchestra sound because they tuned into popular radio shows, such as Fibber McGee & Molly in 1936 and the George Jessel show in 1938, and several shows billed as Tommy Tucker Time. In 1941, Tucker led the orchestra for a New York City version of the Pot o' Gold radio program, which was simulcast on three stations. Tucker opened each performance—on radio or live—with his signature "tic-toc, tic-toc, it's Tommy Tucker time." And he usually ended each session with Time to Go.

== Early life ==
Born Gerald L. Duppler, May 18, 1903, in Souris, North Dakota, he received a Bachelor of Arts at the University of North Dakota in 1924, majored in Music and was recognized as Phi Beta Kappa. Shortly after college, Tucker organized a small band and played at a fairground pavilion in Minot, ND. They played at the Breen Hotel in St. Cloud, MN that winter, and then in the summer of 1926 they played at a popular resort in Detroit, MN—The Pettibone Lodge.

The group began to travel and landed in California. His first recordings were with Crown Records in 1933, under the name Tommy Tucker and His Californians. He used the name Tommy Tucker and His Orchestra for his next recordings for Brunswick in 1935. With Columbia records dominant, Tucker recorded over one thousand sides for over 10 record companies.

Tucker devised his own marketing approach when the band first toured the country. As he planned a route, Tucker would send telegraph messages to various towns announcing that he was traveling through the area, and asked if the proprietor of a venue would like to book him. Later in the early thirties, Joe Galkin became the orchestra's official manager who planned all bookings and arrangements for travel.

== Career highlights and associated talent ==
The Tommy Tucker Orchestra played at the Berkeley-Carteret Hotel in Asbury Park and the Strand Theatre in New York City; the Adams in Newark, NJ; the Earle in Philadelphia; the Oriental in Chicago, and the Shoreham Hotel in Washington, DC—to name a few. Television shows that Tucker appeared on include The Kate Smith Show, Cavalcade of Bands, Arthur Murray House Party, and Strike It Rich.

The musicians associated with Tucker's band included the pianist Hal Dennis, five sax players, including Mac Becker, Roy Underwood, Milton Brodus, Gordon Reaney, Al Little and Gerry Mulligan, clarinetist Clarence Hutchinrider, and trumpeters Carlyle Hall (Sr), Danny Davis, and Clarence Zylman. One of his longtime trumpeters was Carlton "Buster" Brown who played first chair. Vocalists include Amy Arnell, Clare Nelson, Madeline Russell, Kerwin Somerville, Don Brown, Peter Hanley and the Three Two-Timers, reinforcing the clock theme. Eydie Gorme sang with the band when Tucker settled on the east coast near Asbury Park. Many songs recorded over the years were written by Irving Berlin.

When Tucker retired from the band business, he became a professor in music at Monmouth College in West Long Branch, New Jersey, close to his home in the West Allenhurst section of Ocean Township, where he had moved in 1941. He conducted the school's concert band and taught classes for the school's degree programs in music and music education. After twenty years as an educator, he retired to Florida in 1979. He died in Sarasota, Florida on July 11, 1989.

Remembered as a "sweet sound" and appreciated as "swing", critiques note that his charts can contrast "exotic effects with jazz-time passages".
