= Radar Networks =

- Company type: Private
- Industry: Data management
- Founded: 2003
- Founder: Nova Spivack, Kristinn R. Thórisson
- Headquarters: San Francisco, California, USA
- Key people: Nova Spivack, CEO; Sonja Erickson, VP, Systems Engineering; Christopher Jones, VP of Product Development; Jim Wissner, Chief Architect
- Number of employees: 20
- Website: www.radarnetworks.com

Radar Networks was a San Francisco–based company that aimed to develop Semantic Web applications for the general public. Its only public product was the website Twine. The company was founded in 2003 by Nova Spivack and Kristinn R. Thórisson.

Radar Networks was acquired by Evri Inc. in 2010, which soon shut it down.

== History ==
The company was founded in 2003 by web entrepreneur Nova Spivack, grandson of Peter Drucker, and AI researcher Kristinn R. Thórisson. They were soon joined by Jim Wissner, who became the company's chief architect. Thórisson was CTO of Radar Networks until 2004 when he joined Reykjavik University.

In February 2008 the company raised a Series B venture round led by Velocity Interactive Group, Vulcan Capital and Draper Fisher Jurvetson.

The company's only product, Twine, was an online, social web service that was opened to the public on October 21, 2008.

On March 11, 2010, Radar Networks was acquired by Seattle-based Evri Inc. On May 14, 2010, Twine was shut down, becoming a redirect to evri.com. On October 5, 2012, Evri laid off much of its staff and shut down its commercial offerings, including evri.com.
