= Pot o' Gold (radio program) =

- Genre: Game show
- Running time: 30 minutes
- Country of origin: United States
- Language: English
- Home station: WMCA (New York City version)
- Syndicates: NBC-Red (1939-1940); ABC (1946-1947)
- Announcer: Bob Shepherd; Len Sterling
- Produced by: Edward Byron
- Original release: September 26, 1939 – 1947

Pot o' Gold is radio's first big-money giveaway program, garnering huge ratings within four weeks of its 1939 debut. The program kept so many listeners at home and away from movies that "some theater owners offered $1,000 prizes to anyone who was called while attending the movies."

== Premise ==
The premise of the radio program, created by Ed Byron, was that any person who picked up the telephone when host Horace Heidt called would automatically win $1,000. Phone numbers were chosen by three spins on the Wheel of Fortune: (1) choice of phone directory, (2) page number and (3) the line on the page.

== Cast ==
=== 1939-1941 (national) ===
The series ran on NBC from September 26, 1939 to December 23, 1941. Music was supplied by Horace Heidt and his Musical Knights with the original stars Larry Cotton, Frankie Carle, Jean Farney, Ruth Davies, Fred Lowery, Henry Russell, Red Ferrington, Bernie Mattinson and the Le Ahn Sisters. For a time, Art Carney was the announcer.

=== 1941-? (New York City) ===
On January 8, 1941, a local version of Pot o' Gold was launched in New York City. The show originated at WMCA and was simulcast over WHN and WNEW on Wednesdays at 7:30 p.m. Rush Hughes was master of ceremonies, and Tommy Tucker led the orchestra.

=== 1946-1947 (national) ===
A new show by the same name returned on ABC for a run from October 2, 1946 to March 26, 1947 hosted by singing clown Happy Felton with music by the Harry Salter Orchestra and vocalists Vera Holly and Jimmy Carroll (1913–72). The announcer was Bob Shepard (1915–93) who also was the announcer on Counterspy and Break the Bank.

== Legal concerns ==
The first version of the program was cited by the Federal Communications Commission as part of what Broadcasting magazine called a "crusade against prize contest programs as possible violations of the lottery statutes." In February 1940, the FCC asked the United States Department of Justice to initiate an investigation into the program. Two months later, however, the DOJ declined to prosecute, essentially giving Pot o' Gold a "clean bill of health."

== Film ==
The program's success prompted production of a 1941 American romantic comedy film based on the radio series. Directed by George Marshall and produced by James Roosevelt, the movie Pot o' Gold was released April 3, 1941, eight months before the NBC radio series came to an end. Walter DeLeon's screenplay told of a couple romantically involved despite family feuds. James Stewart and Paulette Goddard portrayed the couple, and orchestra leader Heidt appeared as himself.

== See also ==
- Champagne for Caesar
- Dr. I.Q.
- The Jackpot
- Topper Returns
