= Dietrich Dörner =

German psychologist

Dietrich Dörner (born 28 September 1938, Berlin) is emeritus professor for General and Theoretical Psychology at the Institute of Theoretical Psychology at the Otto-Friedrich University in Bamberg, Germany.

In 1986, he received the Gottfried Wilhelm Leibniz Prize of the Deutsche Forschungsgemeinschaft, which is the highest honour awarded in German research.

The cognitive architecture Psi-Theory is developed under his guidance.

== Books ==
- The Logic of Failure: Recognizing And Avoiding Error in Complex Situations (ISBN 0201479486, 1996, Perseus Publishing)
- Bauplan für eine Seele (lit.: Blueprint for a Soul, available in German language only), Reinbek: Rowohlt, 2001 (ISBN 3499611937).
- Die Mechanik des Seelenwagens (lit: Mechanics of the soul's cart, available in German language only), Bern: Huber, 2002 (ISBN 3-456-83814-X).
