= Scientific American Mind =

Bimonthly American popular science magazine

- Categories: Psychology, neuroscience, cognitive science
- Frequency: Bimonthly
- Publisher: Nature Publishing Group
- Founded: 2004
- Final issue: 2017 (print)
- Company: Nature Publishing Group
- Country: United States
- Based in: New York City
- Language: English
- Website: www.scientificamerican.com/mind-and-brain/
- ISSN: 1555-2284

Scientific American Mind was a bimonthly American popular science magazine concentrating on psychology, neuroscience, and related fields. By analyzing and revealing new thinking in the cognitive sciences, the magazine tries to focus on the biggest breakthroughs in these fields. Scientific American Mind is published by Nature Publishing Group which also publishes Scientific American and was established in 2004. The magazine has its headquarters in New York City.

The May/June 2017 issue was the last issue published in print; subsequent issues are available through digital platforms.
