= Happy Felton =

Francis J. Felton Jr. (November 30, 1907 - October 21, 1964) was a bandleader, vaudevillian, and host of children's television programs. He was known professionally as Happy Felton.

== Early years ==
Felton was born Francis J. Felton Jr. on November 30, 1907, in Bellevue, Pennsylvania. He attended Bellevue High School, played football at Allegheny College and the University of Pittsburgh, and graduated from Allegheny in 1929.

When Felton was seven years old, he performed as a violin soloist with the Pittsburgh Symphony Orchestra. During his college years, he organized the Artists of Rhythm orchestra, which played in Cleveland, Buffalo, and other cities. He also was a violinist with the Goodrich Silvertown Orchestra.

Felton acquired his nickname after he portrayed the allegorical character Dr. Happy in a show at Allegheny College.

== Career ==
After Felton graduated from college, he played drums in a circus, was part of a medicine-man show, sang in the Four Ambassadors quartet, and performed in vaudeville with Adele Jason and the Boys. He also was a headliner in vaudeville, including being held over as the head of Loew's State Theatre's vaudeville show in August 1943. Following those activities, he formed and led an orchestra that played in nightclubs and hotels around the United States for 10 years. He left the orchestra to go on Broadway, replacing Chic Johnson in Hellzapoppin, a role that lasted 14 months. Felton went on to play comedic parts in touring companies of Broadway shows and to appear in films, including A Guy Named Joe, Swing Shift Maisie, and Whistling in Brooklyn. He also made Music with a Smile in the Happy Felton Style, a Vitaphone Melody Master 10-minute short subject, in 1938. Felton had starring roles in productions of Muny Opera in St. Louis and Dallas Municipal Opera Company.

Felton began working on radio with a stint on Finders Keepers. His other work on network radio included being host of Stop the Music, quizmaster on Guess Who? and master of ceremonies on Pot o' Gold. He also substituted for Ralph Edwards on Truth or Consequences.

In 1947, Felton formed Happy Songs Incorporated, a music publishing company.

=== Happy Felton's Knothole Gang ===
On April 21, 1950, Happy Felton's Knothole Gang debuted on WOR-TV. Each episode began 25 minutes before a Brooklyn Dodgers home game with Felton and three youngsters in the right-field bullpen at Ebbets Field, the team's home stadium. The boys would "work out with the stars on a competitive basis", after which a player from the Dodgers evaluated the youths on "fielding ability, speed, and baseball competence". All three participants received baseball equipment, and the winner came back the following day to chat with his favorite Dodger player.Felton's famous line for the end of a workout was "Bring 'em in with a grounder, Jackie" if Robinson was the star."

Boys who appeared on the program were initially recommended by leagues in which they played. Those nominees were then screened by the American Legion, the Catholic Youth Organization, and the Police Athletic League to determine the final participants. The program ended in 1958 when the Dodgers left Brooklyn to go to Los Angeles. Felton's obituary in The New York Times noted that the show "greatly spurred Little League and sandlot baseball in the city". The program was initially sponsored by Tidewater Oil Incorporated and the Studebaker Dealers Association of New York.

A review in The New York Times of the June 3, 1955, episode of the Knothole Gang described the show as "a valuable service for youngsters interested in baseball." Critic J. P. Shanley noted that Felton "knows how to talk to youngsters without making them feel foolish or hostile". He also complimented Jackie Robinson for his involvement with them in the workout portion of the show and Carl Erskine for his discussion of pitching techniques with the previous night's winner.

In March 1952, Loew's theaters and Metro-Goldwyn-Mayer concluded a deal that had the two companies sponsoring Knothole Gang broadcasts. The arrangement also included use of Loew's theaters for "movie meetings of the kids on Saturday mornings" with special programs for the children, and plans for special events at Ebbets Field. On the first Saturday of the new program, 50,000 youngsters registered (free) in 35 theaters, and more registration cards were requested. Each session at a theater included showing of a baseball-related film, opportunities to ask questions of a baseball player, and a chance to win prizes. Felton appeared in person at one theater each week, while the others had a Felton film in place of a personal appearance.

=== Other TV programs ===
Felton added a second baseball broadcast in 1951, serving as master of ceremonies of the post-game Talk to the Stars program. Each episode featured one Brooklyn player and a player from the visiting team. Initially fans called in questions to ask players, but popularity of the show brought a change to having questions sent in on postcards. Submissions averaged about 5,000 postcards per week.

In 1948, Felton had the teacher's role on School Days, which was broadcast on Wednesday nights on the DuMont Television Network with its premise based on a vaudeville routine. With guests seated at student desks, Felton gave assignments such as blowing up balloons until they burst. The program was revived in 1949 as School House (also on DuMont) with Kenny Delmar replacing Felton.

Happy Felton's Spotlight Club, an audience-participation show for children, was broadcast on NBC on Saturday mornings from December 4, 1954, until February 26, 1955. Felton was master of ceremonies of It's a Hit on CBS on Saturday mornings from June 1, 1957, until September 21, 1957. Baseball stars (including Duke Snider and Curt Simmons), managed the teams as players gained hits and runs by answering questions correctly to win prizes.

== Personal life and death ==
Felton married composer Vi Brantley on June 4, 1942, in Baltimore, and they had two daughters. He died on October 21, 1964, at Mount Sinai Hospital, aged 56.
