= Ipke Wachsmuth =

German computer scientist

Ipke Wachsmuth (born 27 March 1950 in Rehren, district Schaumburg) is a German computer scientist in the fields of artificial intelligence and cognitive science.

Ipke Wachsmuth obtained a doctoral degree in computer science from the University of Hannover in 1980. During his career, he held positions at Osnabrück University, Northern Illinois University, and IBM Germany. He is now Emeritus Professor of Artificial Intelligence at Bielefeld University, where he headed the artificial intelligence group from 1989 to 2014. From 2002 until 2009 he was director of the Center for Interdisciplinary Research (Zentrum für Interdisziplinäre Forschung, ZiF) in Bielefeld. His research mainly focused on human-machine interaction and virtual reality.

Wachsmuth is known for connecting classical symbolic techniques of knowledge representation with elements of dynamic gestures and facial expressions. This is especially exemplified by the development of the embodied agent Max. Since the 1990s Wachsmuth has also been a driving force behind the Interdisciplinary College, an annual spring school in the fields of neurobiology, neural computation, cognitive science, artificial intelligence, robotics and philosophy.

== Selected Publications ==
- Wachsmuth, Ipke (2000). "The concept of intelligence in AI". In Prerational Intelligence: Adaptive Behavior and Intelligent Systems without Symbols and Logic. Ed. Cruse, Holk et al. Dordrecht: Kluwer Academic Publishers, 43-55. doi: 10.1007/978-94-010-0870-9_5.
- Kopp, Stefan; Wachsmuth, Ipke (2004). "Synthesizing multimodal utterances for conversational agents". Computer Animation and Virtual Worlds 15(1), 39-52. doi: 10.1002/cav.6.
- Kopp, Stefan; Gesellensetter, Lars; Krämer, Nicole C.; Wachsmuth, Ipke (2005). "A conversational agent as museum guide". Intelligent Virtual Agents. Ed. Panayiotopoulos, Themis et al. Lecture notes in artificial intelligence, vol. 3661. Berlin: Springer, 329-343. doi: 10.1007/11550617_28.
- Wachsmuth, Ipke; Lenzen, Manuela; Knoblich, Günther eds. (2008). Embodied communication in humans and machines. Oxford: Oxford University Press. doi: 10.1093/acprof:oso/9780199231751.001.0001.
- Becker-Asano, Christian; Wachsmuth, Ipke (2010). "Affective computing with primary and secondary emotions in a virtual human". Autonomous Agents and Multi-Agent Systems 20(1), 32-49. doi: 10.1007/s10458-009-9094-9
- Salem, Maha; Kopp, Stefan; Wachsmuth, Ipke; et al. (2012). "Generation and evaluation of communicative robot gesture". International Journal of Social Robotics 4, 201-217. doi: 10.1007/s12369-011-0124-9.
- Hülsmann, Felix; Fröhlich, Julia; Mattar, Nikita; Wachsmuth, Ipke (2014). "Wind and warmth in virtual reality: implementation and evaluation" in VRIC '14: Proceedings of the Virtual Reality International Conference 24, 1-8. doi: 10.1145/2617841.2620712
- Wachsmuth, Ipke (2018). "Robots Like Me: Challenges and Ethical Issues in Aged Care". Frontiers in Psychology 9:432. doi: 10.3389/fpsyg.2018.00432.
