= Bottlenose (company) =

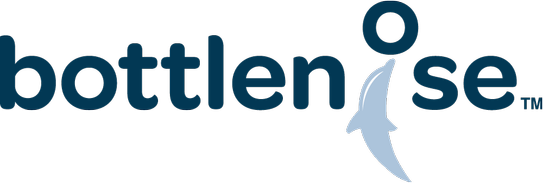
- Type: Private
- Industry: Big data analytics
- Founded: 2010
- Headquarters: Los Angeles, CA
- Website: www.bottlenose.com

Bottlenose.com, also known as Bottlenose, is an enterprise trend intelligence company that analyzes big data and business data to detect trends for brands. It helps Fortune 500 enterprises discover, and track emerging trends that affect their brands. The company uses natural language processing, sentiment analysis, statistical algorithms, data mining, and machine learning heuristics to determine trends, and has a search engine that gathers information from social networks. KPMG Capital has invested a "substantial amount" in the company.

Bottlenose processed 72 billion messages per day, in real-time, from across social and broadcast media, as of December 2014.

== History ==
The company is based in Los Angeles, CA. Bottlenose is a real-time trend intelligence tool that measures social media campaigns and trends. The company also provides a free version of its Sonar tool that shows real-time trends across social media.

In October 2012, the company received $1 million of funding from ff Venture Capital and Prosper Capital. By 2014, the company raised about $7 million in funding. In December 2014, KPMG Capital announced further investment in the company. In February 2015, the company confirmed it had raised $13.4 million in Series B funding led by KPMG Capital.

Bottlenose partnered with the nonprofit No Labels during the 2014 State of the Union Address to analyze Twitter conversations for bipartisanship. The company also partnered with media monitoring company Critical Mention to analyze broadcast analytics. The Bottlenose Nerve Center integrated with the Critical Mention API to analyze real-time trends in television and radio broadcasts.

In June 2014, Bottlenose updated its trend detection product to Nerve Center 2.0. It creates a newsfeed to show changes in trends and sends alerts when trends occur. It also has "emotion detection," which will display the emotions associated with specific comments on trending topics. In 2016, Bottlenose released its Nerve Center 3.0 platform, which was designed to automate the work of data scientists and lower the cost of artificial intelligence for businesses.

== See also ==
- Sentiment analysis
- Big data analysis
