= Souris, North Dakota =

Souris
- City
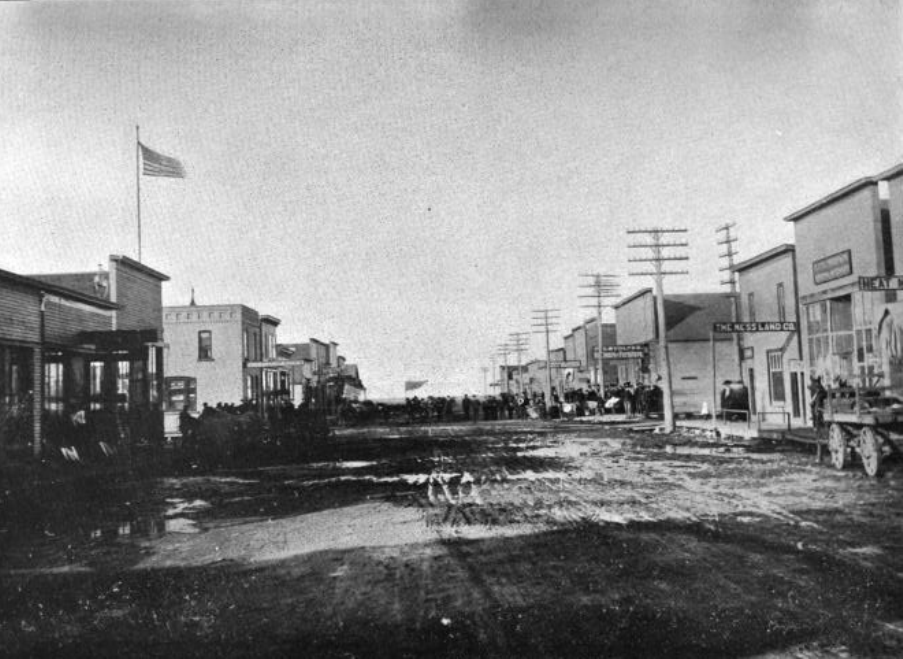
- Main Street in Souris circa 1906

- Location of Souris, North Dakota
- Coordinates: 48°54′36″N 100°40′58″W
- Country: United States
- State: North Dakota
- County: Bottineau
- Founded: 1901

Area
  - Total: 0.097 sq mi (0.25 km^{2})
  - Land: 0.097 sq mi (0.25 km^{2})
  - Water: 0 sq mi (0.00 km^{2})
- Elevation: 1,512 ft (461 m)

Population (2020)
  - Total: 37
  - Estimate (2022): 39
  - Density: 378.3/sq mi (146.07/km^{2})
- Time zone: UTC–6 (Central (CST))
  - Summer (DST): UTC–5 (CDT)
- ZIP Code: 58783
- Area code: 701
- FIPS code: 38-74020
- GNIS feature ID: 1036265
- Website: www.sourisnd.com

Souris is a city in Bottineau County, North Dakota, United States. The population was 37 at the 2020 census. Souris was founded in 1901.

== Geography ==
Souris is in the central part of the county. It is named after the Souris River, which flows through the area.

According to the United States Census Bureau, the city has a total area of 0.10 square miles (0.26 km^{2}), all land.

== Demographics ==
Historical population
Census	Pop.	Note	%±
1910	267		—
1920	269		0.7%
1930	248		−7.8%
1940	259		4.4%
1950	206		−20.5%
1960	213		3.4%
1970	151		−29.1%
1980	122		−19.2%
1990	97		−20.5%
2000	83		−14.4%
2010	58		−30.1%
2020	37		−36.2%
2022 (est.)	39		5.4%
U.S. Decennial Census; 2020 Census

=== 2010 census ===
As of the census of 2010, there were 58 people, 32 households, and 16 families living in the city. The population density was 580.0 inhabitants per square mile (223.9/km^{2}). There were 45 housing units at an average density of 450.0 per square mile (173.7/km^{2}). The racial makeup of the city was 96.6% White, 1.7% Native American, and 1.7% from two or more races.

There were 32 households, of which 18.8% had children under the age of 18 living with them, 40.6% were married couples living together, 9.4% had a male householder with no wife present, and 50.0% were non-families. 50.0% of all households were made up of individuals, and 15.7% had someone living alone who was 65 years of age or older. The average household size was 1.81 and the average family size was 2.50.

The median age in the city was 48 years. 17.2% of residents were under the age of 18; 8.7% were between the ages of 18 and 24; 13.7% were from 25 to 44; 36.2% were from 45 to 64; and 24.1% were 65 years of age or older. The gender makeup of the city was 56.9% male and 43.1% female.

=== 2000 census ===
As of the census of 2000, there were 83 people, 32 households, and 20 families living in the city. The population density was 819.6 inhabitants per square mile (316.4/km^{2}). There were 46 housing units at an average density of 454.2 per square mile (175.4/km^{2}). The racial makeup of the city was 100.00% White.

There were 32 households, out of which 40.6% had children under the age of 18 living with them, 59.4% were married couples living together, 3.1% had a female householder with no husband present, and 34.4% were non-families. 34.4% of all households were made up of individuals, and 18.8% had someone living alone who was 65 years of age or older. The average household size was 2.59 and the average family size was 3.43.

In the city, the population was spread out, with 34.9% under the age of 18, 3.6% from 18 to 24, 21.7% from 25 to 44, 21.7% from 45 to 64, and 18.1% who were 65 years of age or older. The median age was 35 years. For every 100 females, there were 102.4 males. For every 100 females age 18 and over, there were 107.7 males.

The median income for a household in the city was $21,250, and the median income for a family was $35,625. Males had a median income of $22,500 versus $17,917 for females. The per capita income for the city was $9,387. There were 18.8% of families and 16.2% of the population living below the poverty line, including 18.5% of under eighteens and none of those over 64.

== Notable people ==
- Edward L. Garden (1873–1936), North Dakota state legislator
- Tommy Tucker (1903–1989), big band and radio bandleader

== See also ==
- Carbury–Goodlands Border Crossing
