= Twine (social network) =

- Website type: Public semantic web service
- Creator: Radar Networks
- Website: twine.com
- Commercial: Yes
- Registration: Optional
- Launched: October 19, 2007; 19 years ago
- Current status: Inactive

Twine (at Twine.com) was an online social web service for information storage, authoring and discovery that existed from 2007 to 2010. It was created and run by Radar Networks. It was announced on October 19, 2007 and opened to the public on October 21, 2008. On March 11, 2010, Radar Networks was acquired by Evri Inc. along with Twine.com. On May 14, 2010, twine.com was shut down, becoming a redirect to evri.com.

Twine combined features of forums, wikis, online databases and newsgroups and employed intelligent software that automatically mined and stored data relationships expressed using RDF statements.

== Site description ==
Twine serviced information storage, authoring and discovery through its website and browser-based tools. The service, intended for regular web users, attempted to automate certain processes related to data categorization and keyword-association (tagging). The system employed natural language processing and machine learning to extract concepts from written text in user data, and expressed it using RDF triples tied to a semantic taxonomy based on concepts mined from Wikipedia. This makes it easier for machines to process the data. The extracted data could be used in searches to additionally select the type of thing the user wanted to find, such as person or location.

Twine was a social network and its users could add contacts, send private messages and share information. Users could collaborate on collecting data through private or public twines; data collections focused on a certain topic, such as politics.

Data could be imported to Twine's website through conventional uploading of files, writing text with a WYSIWYG editor or using a bookmarking tool for webpages. The tool worked similarly to other social bookmarking websites. Users could manually write summaries, specify keywords (tags) and select an image to include in the bookmark that appears on Twine's website. Certain types of media in bookmarks, such as YouTube videos, were automatically embedded in Twine's pages when bookmarked. Twine also offered limited wiki capabilities to collaboratively edit documents.

Information discovery was mostly done through a user's main page where items appeared, organized by the twine they belonged to. Twine also used machine learning technologies that used semantic metadata to learn and generate more relevant, automatic information recommendations of possible interest to the user.

== History ==
Radar Networks remained in stealth mode until October 19, 2007, when Twine was announced and limited invitations were handed out for beta testing. In February 2008 it was announced that Radar Networks raised a Series B venture round led by Velocity Interactive Group, Vulcan Capital and Draper Fisher Jurvetson. The service became visible to the public and search engines in July 2008. Approximately 50,000 people had signed up during Twine's beta-phase and 34,000 were active at that time. Twine went public on October 21, 2008.

On March 11, 2010, the search engine Evri Inc. announced the acquisition of Radar Networks and Twine.com.

On October 5, 2012, Evri laid off much of its staff and shut down its commercial offerings, including evri.com

== See also ==
- Freebase (database) — Online semantic database
- Resource Description Framework (RDF)
- Semantic Web
- Web 2.0
- Web Ontology Language (OWL)
