= Agent architecture =

Agent architecture is the internal design of an intelligent agent. It describes the agent's components, their functions, and how they work together to produce its behavior. In computer science the term often means a blueprint for software agents and intelligent control systems that shows how their components fit together. Designs are usually divided into reactive, deliberative and hybrid kinds, and the architectures found in intelligent agents are also studied as cognitive architectures. More recently, large language models have started to act as the reasoning core of another kind of agent design.

== Types ==
Agent architectures include reactive, deliberative, and layered or hybrid designs. Cognitive architectures describe the organization of abilities such as perception, memory, learning, and reasoning. These approaches differ in how they organize information and choose actions.

=== Reactive architectures ===
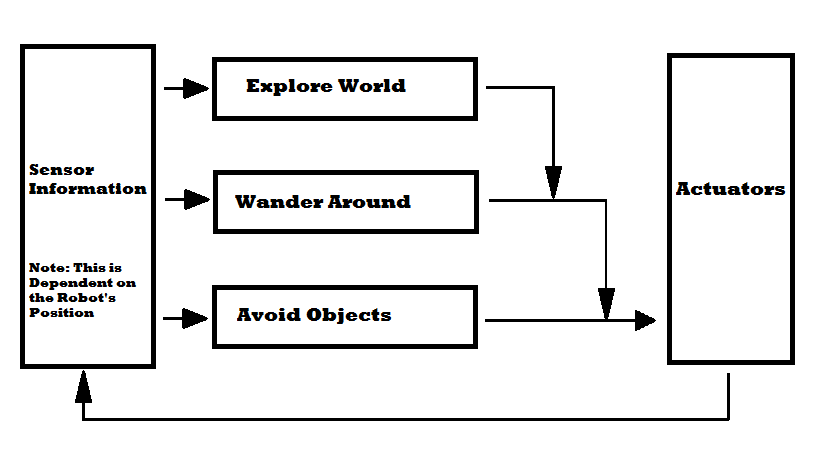
Abstract diagram of a subsumption architecture

A reactive architecture ties behavior directly to what the agent senses at the moment and does not depend on a rich internal model of the world. An example is the subsumption architecture, a layered control design that Rodney Brooks developed for mobile robots. Each layer adds a more capable level of behavior on top of the layers below it, and each layer is built from small modules that run independently and pass only brief messages to one another.

An upper layer can control lower-level behavior by suppressing inputs or inhibiting outputs, while the lower-level modules continue to run. This design allows engineers to add new layers of behavior while keeping the existing lower-level layers.

=== Deliberative reasoning architectures ===
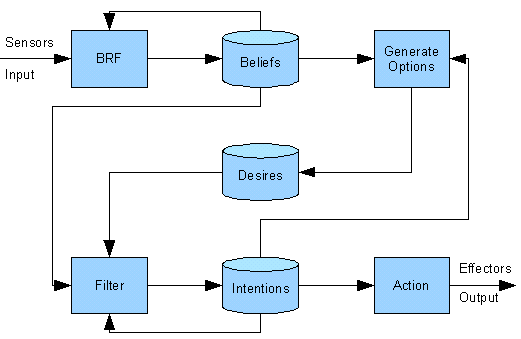
A simple belief–desire–intention (BDI) agent architecture

A deliberative architecture uses an internal model of the world and reasoning about goals to choose actions. One approach to deliberative reasoning is the belief-desire-intention (BDI) model, which describes an agent through three kinds of mental states: beliefs (what it takes to be true), desires (what it would like to achieve) and intentions (the goals or courses of action it has chosen to pursue). BDI provides a framework for building agents that select and carry out plans.

Since its introduction, BDI has been implemented in many forms. Researchers have developed agent programming languages, interpreters, and platforms that implement BDI in different ways. In their 2020 survey, de Silva and colleagues compare the main parts of BDI systems and how agent programming languages implement them. The survey discusses the benefits and limitations of different design choices.

=== Layered/hybrid architectures ===
A hybrid architecture combines quick reactions, planning and interaction with other agents inside a single system. An example is TouringMachines, which Ferguson designed. It stacks three layers, one for reactive behavior, one for planning and one for modeling.

The reactive layer produces fast responses to events in the environment. The planning layer decides what to focus on and uses a planner to work toward the agent's goals. The modeling layer monitors the agent's goals, explains discrepancies between what was expected and what happens, and predicts possible goal conflicts. The three layers run concurrently, and a control framework of suppressors and censors lets them mediate one another's outputs. With this arrangement, an agent that has limited resources and goals of its own can react quickly to surprises and think ahead about possible conflicts.

Ferguson argued that reactive behavior alone, or deliberation alone, is insufficient for agents that work in changing and unpredictable surroundings shared with other agents. In his account, deliberative planners tend to assume a static world and complete knowledge, which changing surroundings do not provide, while purely non-deliberative designs respond quickly but lack explicit goals and the ability to reason about time and the plans of other agents. He tested the design in TouringWorld, a simulated multi-agent environment built for studying how an agent's design relates to its behavior. The work covers individual agents that pursue their own tasks, and it leaves learning out.

=== Cognitive architectures ===
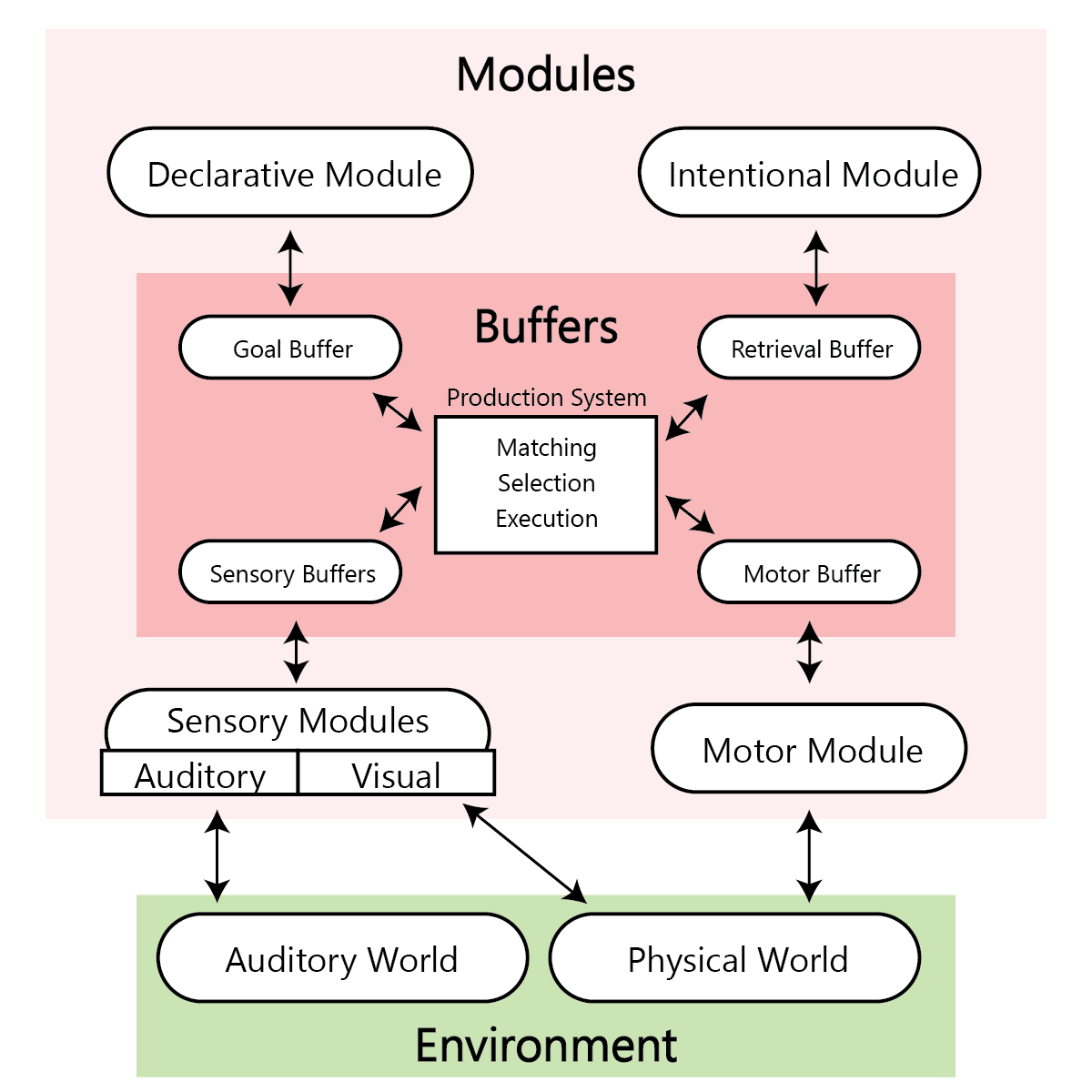
Simplified schematic of the ACT-R cognitive architecture

A cognitive architecture tries to reproduce how human minds work, rather than only engineering useful behavior. Examples include ACT-R, Soar and Clarion. Kotseruba and Tsotsos reviewed four decades of such systems, focusing on core abilities such as perception, attention, action selection, memory, learning, and reasoning, and catalogued over 900 projects where these architectures have been put to practical use.

Learning is one area where these architectures have been compared closely. Hélie and Sun surveyed how psychologically oriented cognitive architectures, including ACT-R, Soar and Clarion, support autonomous learning.

A more recent question is whether these architectures can let a robot keep learning on its own throughout its working life. Romero and colleagues argue that such a robot needs four components: a motivational system, a contextual memory system, an online learning system and an attention system. Judging the architectures they studied against this list, they concluded that none is complete yet, though several show promising directions, and that the missing pieces are motivational systems, long-term contextual memory and dependable learning methods. They also note that most existing developments address only part of the robotic system, and that these components have rarely been considered together.

== LLM-based agent architectures ==
Large language model (LLM)-based agent architectures use language models to interpret information, support decision-making, and select actions. Such agents may combine a language model with a memory system and tools for interacting with an external environment. Wang and colleagues describe a general framework consisting of four modules: profiling, memory, planning, and action. The framework is intended to compare different designs, rather than prescribe a fixed implementation for every LLM-based agent.

The profiling module defines an agent's role, characteristics, and behavioral constraints, often through instructions supplied to the language model. Profiles can also distinguish the responsibilities of agents working together in a multi-agent system. The memory module stores and retrieves information from previous interactions and observations. Memory mechanisms may distinguish between temporary context and longer-term records, while retrieval can prioritize information by relevance, recency, or importance. In the Generative Agents research, simulated characters recorded experiences in a memory stream and combined selected memories into reflections, which informed their later behavior.

The planning module organizes an agent's behavior in relation to a goal. It may divide a complex task into smaller steps, arrange them in sequence, and revise the plan when new information becomes available. The ReAct method illustrates an approach that alternates language-model-generated reasoning with interactions involving external tools or environments; the resulting observations can affect subsequent decisions. The action module carries out decisions through outputs or interactions, such as generating text, retrieving information, communicating with another agent, or calling an application programming interface (API). The surrounding software determines which operations the agent can perform. Results from these actions may become new observations used in later planning or memory retrieval.

These components can operate together rather than as independent stages. In the Generative Agents system, each simulated character had a description of its identity and background, retained a record of experiences, formed plans using relevant memories, and selected actions in response to events in a virtual environment. The design of LLM-based agents also raises challenges involving the retrieval of relevant memories, the revision of plans after unexpected observations, and the reliability of actions performed through external tools. Research surveys accordingly discuss both architectural approaches and methods of evaluating agent behavior.

== See also ==
- Intelligent agent
- Cognitive architecture
- Multi-agent system
- Belief–desire–intention software model
- Action selection
- Real-time Control System
