= Unified Theories of Cognition =

Unified Theories of Cognition is a 1990 book by Allen Newell. Newell argues for the need of a set of general assumptions for cognitive models that account for all of cognition: a unified theory of cognition, or cognitive architecture. The research started by Newell on unified theories of cognition represents a crucial element of divergence with respect to the vision of his long-term collaborator, and AI pioneer, Herbert Simon for what concerns the future of artificial intelligence research. Antonio Lieto recently drew attention to such a discrepancy, by pointing out that Herbert Simon decided to focus on the construction of single simulative programs (or microtheories/"middle-range" theories) that were considered a sufficient mean to enable the generalisation of “unifying” theories of cognition (i.e. according to Simon the "unification" was assumed to be derivable from a body of qualitative generalizations coming from the study of individual simulative programs). Newell, on the other hand, didn’t consider the construction of single simulative microtheories a sufficient mean to enable the generalisation of “unifying” theories of cognition and, in fact, started the enterprise of studying and developing integrated and multi-tasking intelligence via cognitive architectures that would have led to the development of the Soar cognitive architecture.

== Contents ==
Newell argues that the mind functions as a single system. He also claims the established cognitive models are vastly underdetermined by experimental data. By cognition, Newell means:

- Problem solving, decision making, routine action
- Memory, learning, skill
- Perception, motor behavior
- Language
- Motivation, emotion
- Imagining, dreaming, daydreaming

After arguing in favor of the development of unified theories of cognition, Newell puts forward a list of constraints to any unified theory, in that a theory should explain how a mind does the following:

1. Behave flexibly as a function of the environment
2. Exhibit adaptive (rational, goal-oriented) behavior
3. Operate in real time
4. Operate in a rich, complex, detailed environment (Perceive an immense amount of changing detail; use vast amounts of knowledge; and control a motor system of many degrees of freedom)
5. Use symbols and abstractions
6. Use language, both natural and artificial
7. Learn from the environment and from experience
8. Acquire capabilities through development
9. Operate autonomously, but within a social community
10. Be self-aware and have a sense of self
11. Be realizable as a neural system
12. Be construable by an embryological growth process
13. Arise through evolution

Newell's secondary task is to put forward the cognitive architecture Soar as an implementation of a UTC that meets the constraints above. Other efforts at unified theories of cognition cited in the book include ACT-R and the human processor model.

== See also ==
- Blue Brain Project
- Cognitive architecture
- Soar
