= Max Garagnani =

Neuroscientist

- Education: University of Bologna; University of Durham; Cambridge University
- Known for: Neural Networks; Computational neuroscience Bioplausibility
- Awards: Gonda Brain Research Grant; EPSRC Fast-stream Grant; CSREA IC-AI Achievement Award; EU Marie Curie Fellowship
- Scientific career
- Fields: Theoretical neuroscience Computational neuroscience Computational cognition
- Workplaces: University of London; Free University of Berlin; University of Plymouth; Medical Research Council (United Kingdom); The Open University
- Doctoral advisors: Derek Long, Maria Fox (University of Durham); Friedemann Pulvermüller (Cambridge University)

Massimiliano (Max) Garagnani is a university professor at the University of London, and is primarily known for his work on bio-realistic neural network models that closely mimic the structure, connectivity, and physiology of the human cortex. Garagnani presently runs the Goldsmiths Computational Cognitive Neuroscience Postgraduate Programme at the University of London, and further serves as a visiting researcher at the Free University of Berlin.

His contributions to the field of computational neuroscience have earned him a number of awards and honors, including the CSREA International Conference on AI Achievement Award, an EU Marie Curie Research Training Grant (TMR Programme), a Cambridge European Trust Scholarship, a UK EPSRC Fast-stream Grant, and memberships into the Experimental Psychology Society, the Society for the Neurobiology of Language, and the Organization for Computational Neuroscience.

== Biography ==
Garagnani obtained his Bachelor of Science and his Master of Science degrees in 1994 through an accelerated program at the University of Bologna in Italy. He then went on to obtain his doctorate in Artificial Intelligence from the University of Durham in 1999, followed by a postdoctoral stint at The Open University.

During his time there, he sat as associate editor of the journal of Expert Systems, and served as a visiting scholar at the University of California, Berkeley and the International Computer Science Institute in Berkeley, California, US, developing a neurally plausible connectionist model of language processing and reflexive reasoning based on temporal synchrony and dynamic binding alongside Dr. Lokendra Shastri. He left this post in 2005, opting for a second PhD, this one in computational cognitive neuroscience, at Cambridge University.

Upon its completion in 2008, Garagnani joined the Medical Research Council - Cognition and Brain Sciences Unit in Cambridge as an Investigator Scientist. He departed from the MRC in 2012, becoming a visiting researcher at Cambridge University's Department of Experimental Psychology. He balanced this position with a postdoctoral fellowship at the University of Plymouth, which he held until 2016.

As of 2023, Garagnani is a Senior Lecturer (Associate Professor) in Computer Science and programme leader at the University of London, as well as a visiting researcher at the Brain Language Laboratory at the Free University of Berlin. He sits on the editorial boards of the journals of Frontiers in Computational Neuroscience and Frontiers in Psychology - Cognition, is Associate Editor of IET Cognitive Computation and Systems, and holds a position on the Board of Directors of the Organization for Computational Neuroscience.

== Awards and honors ==
- EPS Grindley Grant
- Gonda Brain Research Grant
- CSREA Achievement Award
- EU Marie Curie Fellow
- EPSRC Fast-Stream Research Grant
- Experimental Psychology Society
- Organization for Computational Neuroscience
- Cambridge European Trust Scholar (Honorary)

== Select publications ==
- Garagnani, Max; Wennekers, Thomas; Pulvermüller, Friedemann (2008-01-18). "A neuroanatomically grounded Hebbian-learning model of attention–language interactions in the human brain". European Journal of Neuroscience. 27 (2): 492–513. doi:10.1111/j.1460-9568.2008.06015.x. PMC 2258460. PMID 18215243.
- Wennekers, Thomas; Garagnani, Max; Pulvermüller, Friedemann (2006-07-01). "Language models based on Hebbian cell assemblies". Journal of Physiology. 100 (1–3): 16–30. doi:10.1016/j.jphysparis.2006.09.007. PMID 17081735. S2CID 10029905.
- Garagnani, Max; Shtyrov, Yury; Pulvermüller, Friedemann (2009-06-30). "Effects of attention on what is known and what is not: MEG evidence for functionally discrete memory circuits". Frontiers in Neuroscience. 3 (10): 10. doi:10.3389/neuro.09.010.2009. PMC 2715270. PMID 19680433.
