= Cognitive architecture =

Blueprint for intelligent agents

A cognitive architecture is both a theory about the structure of the human mind and a computational instantiation of such a theory used in the fields of artificial intelligence (AI) and computational cognitive science. These formalized models can be used to further refine comprehensive theories of cognition and serve as the frameworks for useful artificial intelligence programs. Successful cognitive architectures include ACT-R (Adaptive Control of Thought – Rational) and SOAR. The research on cognitive architectures as software instantiation of cognitive theories was initiated by Allen Newell in 1990.

A theory for a cognitive architecture is an "hypothesis about the fixed structures that provide a mind, whether in natural or artificial systems, and how they work together — in conjunction with knowledge and skills embodied within the architecture — to yield intelligent behavior in a diversity of complex environments."

== History ==
Herbert A. Simon, one of the founders of the field of artificial intelligence, stated that the 1960 thesis by his student Ed Feigenbaum, EPAM provided a possible "architecture for cognition" because it included some commitments for how more than one fundamental aspect of the human mind worked (in EPAM's case, human memory and human learning).

John R. Anderson started research on human memory in the early 1970s and his 1973 thesis with Gordon H. Bower provided a theory of human associative memory. He included more aspects of his research on long-term memory and thinking processes into this research and eventually designed a cognitive architecture he eventually called ACT. He and his students were influenced by Allen Newell's use of the term "cognitive architecture". Anderson's lab used the term to refer to the ACT theory as embodied in a collection of papers and designs. (There was not a complete implementation of ACT at the time.)

In 1983 John R. Anderson published the seminal work in this area, entitled The Architecture of Cognition. One can distinguish between the theory of cognition and the implementation of the theory. The theory of cognition outlined the structure of the various parts of the mind and made commitments to the use of rules, associative networks, and other aspects. The cognitive architecture implements the theory on computers. The software used to implement the cognitive architectures was also called "cognitive architectures". Thus, a cognitive architecture can also refer to a blueprint for intelligent agents. It proposes (artificial) computational processes that act like certain cognitive systems. Most often, these processes are based on human cognition, but other intelligent systems may also be suitable. Cognitive architectures form a subset of general agent architectures. The term 'architecture' implies an approach that attempts to model not only behavior, but also structural properties of the modelled system.

== Distinctions ==
Cognitive architectures can be symbolic, connectionist, or hybrid. Some cognitive architectures or models are based on a set of generic rules, as, e.g., the Information Processing Language (e.g., Soar based on the unified theory of cognition, or similarly ACT-R). Many of these architectures are based on principle that cognition is computational (see computationalism). In contrast, subsymbolic processing specifies no such a priori assumptions, relying only on emergent properties of processing units (e.g., nodes). Hybrid architectures such as CLARION combine both types of processing. A further distinction is whether the architecture is centralized, with a neural correlate of a processor at its core, or decentralized (distributed). Decentralization has become popular under the name of parallel distributed processing in mid-1980s and connectionism, a prime example being the neural network. A further design issue is additionally a decision between holistic and atomistic, or (more concretely) modular structure.

In traditional AI, intelligence is programmed in a top-down fashion. Although such a system may be designed to learn, the programmer ultimately must imbue it with their own intelligence. Biologically-inspired computing, on the other hand, takes a more bottom-up, decentralized approach; bio-inspired techniques often involve the method of specifying a set of simple generic rules or a set of simple nodes, from the interaction of which emerges the overall behavior. It is hoped to build up complexity until the end result is something markedly complex (see complex systems). However, it is also arguable that systems designed top-down on the basis of observations of what humans and other animals can do, rather than on observations of brain mechanisms, are also biologically inspired, though in a different way.

== Notable examples ==
Some well-known cognitive architectures, in alphabetical order:

Name	Description
4CAPS	developed at Carnegie Mellon University by Marcel A. Just and Sashank Varma.
4D-RCS Reference Model Architecture	developed by James Albus at NIST is a reference model architecture that provides a theoretical foundation for designing, engineering, integrating intelligent systems software for unmanned ground vehicles.
ACT-R	developed at Carnegie Mellon University under John R. Anderson.
Extended Artificial Memory	developed at TU Kaiserslautern under Lars Ludwig.
ASMO	developed by Rony Novianto, Mary-Anne Williams and Benjamin Johnston at the University of Technology Sydney. This cognitive architecture is based on the idea that actions/behaviours compete for an agents resources.
CHREST	developed under Fernand Gobet at Brunel University and Peter C. Lane at the University of Hertfordshire.
CLARION	the cognitive architecture, developed under Ron Sun at Rensselaer Polytechnic Institute and University of Missouri.
CMAC	The Cerebellar Model Articulation Controller (CMAC) is a type of neural network based on a model of the mammalian cerebellum. It is a type of associative memory. The CMAC was first proposed as a function modeler for robotic controllers by James Albus in 1975 and has been extensively used in reinforcement learning and also as for automated classification in the machine learning community.
Copycat	by Douglas Hofstadter and Melanie Mitchell at the Indiana University.
DAYDREAMER	developed by Erik Mueller at the University of California in Los Angeles under Michael G. Dyer
DUAL	developed at the New Bulgarian University under Boicho Kokinov.
FORR	developed by Susan L. Epstein at The City University of New York.
Framsticks	a connectionist distributed neural architecture for simulated creatures or robots, where modules of neural networks composed of heterogenous neurons (including receptors and effectors) can be designed and evolved.
Google DeepMind	The company has created a neural network that learns how to play video games in a similar fashion to humans and a neural network that may be able to access an external memory like a conventional Turing machine, resulting in a computer that appears to possibly mimic the short-term memory of the human brain. The underlying algorithm is based on a combination of Q-learning with multilayer recurrent neural network. (Also see an overview by Jürgen Schmidhuber on earlier related work in deep learning.)
Holographic associative memory	This architecture is part of the family of correlation-based associative memories, where information is mapped onto the phase orientation of complex numbers on a Riemann plane. It was inspired by holonomic brain model by Karl H. Pribram. Holographs have been shown to be effective for associative memory tasks, generalization, and pattern recognition with changeable attention.
Hierarchical temporal memory	This architecture is an online machine learning model developed by Jeff Hawkins and Dileep George of Numenta, Inc. that models some of the structural and algorithmic properties of the neocortex. HTM is a biomimetic model based on the memory-prediction theory of brain function described by Jeff Hawkins in his book On Intelligence. HTM is a method for discovering and inferring the high-level causes of observed input patterns and sequences, thus building an increasingly complex model of the world.
CoJACK	An ACT-R inspired extension to the JACK multi-agent system that adds a cognitive architecture to the agents for eliciting more realistic (human-like) behaviors in virtual environments.
IDA and LIDA	implementing Global Workspace Theory, developed under Stan Franklin at the University of Memphis.
MANIC (Cognitive Architecture)	Michael S. Gashler, University of Arkansas.
PRS	'Procedural Reasoning System', developed by Michael Georgeff and Amy Lansky at SRI International. Implementation of the BDI model.
Psi-Theory	developed under Dietrich Dörner at the Otto-Friedrich University in Bamberg, Germany.
Spaun (Semantic Pointer Architecture Unified Network)	by Chris Eliasmith at the Centre for Theoretical Neuroscience at the University of Waterloo – Spaun is a network of 2,500,000 artificial spiking neurons, which uses groups of these neurons to complete cognitive tasks via flexibile coordination. Components of the model communicate using spiking neurons that implement neural representations called "semantic pointers" using various firing patterns. Semantic pointers can be understood as being elements of a compressed neural vector space.
Soar	developed under Allen Newell and John Laird at Carnegie Mellon University and the University of Michigan.
Society of Mind	proposed by Marvin Minsky.
The Emotion Machine	proposed by Marvin Minsky.
Sparse distributed memory	was proposed by Pentti Kanerva at NASA Ames Research Center as a realizable architecture that could store large patterns and retrieve them based on partial matches with patterns representing current sensory inputs.
Subsumption architectures	developed e.g. by Rodney Brooks (though it could be argued whether they are cognitive).

== See also ==
- Artificial brain
- Artificial consciousness
- Autonomous agent
- Biologically inspired cognitive architectures
- Blue Brain Project
- BRAIN Initiative
- Cognitive architecture comparison
- Cognitive computing
- Cognitive science
- Commonsense reasoning
- Computer architecture
- Conceptual space
- Deep learning
- Google Brain
- Image schema
- Knowledge level
- Modular Cognition Framework
- Neocognitron
- Neural correlates of consciousness
- Pandemonium architecture
- Simulated reality
- Social simulation
- Unified theory of cognition
- Never-Ending Language Learning
- Bayesian Brain
- Open Mind Common Sense
