= Antonio Lieto =

Italian computer scientist (born 1983)

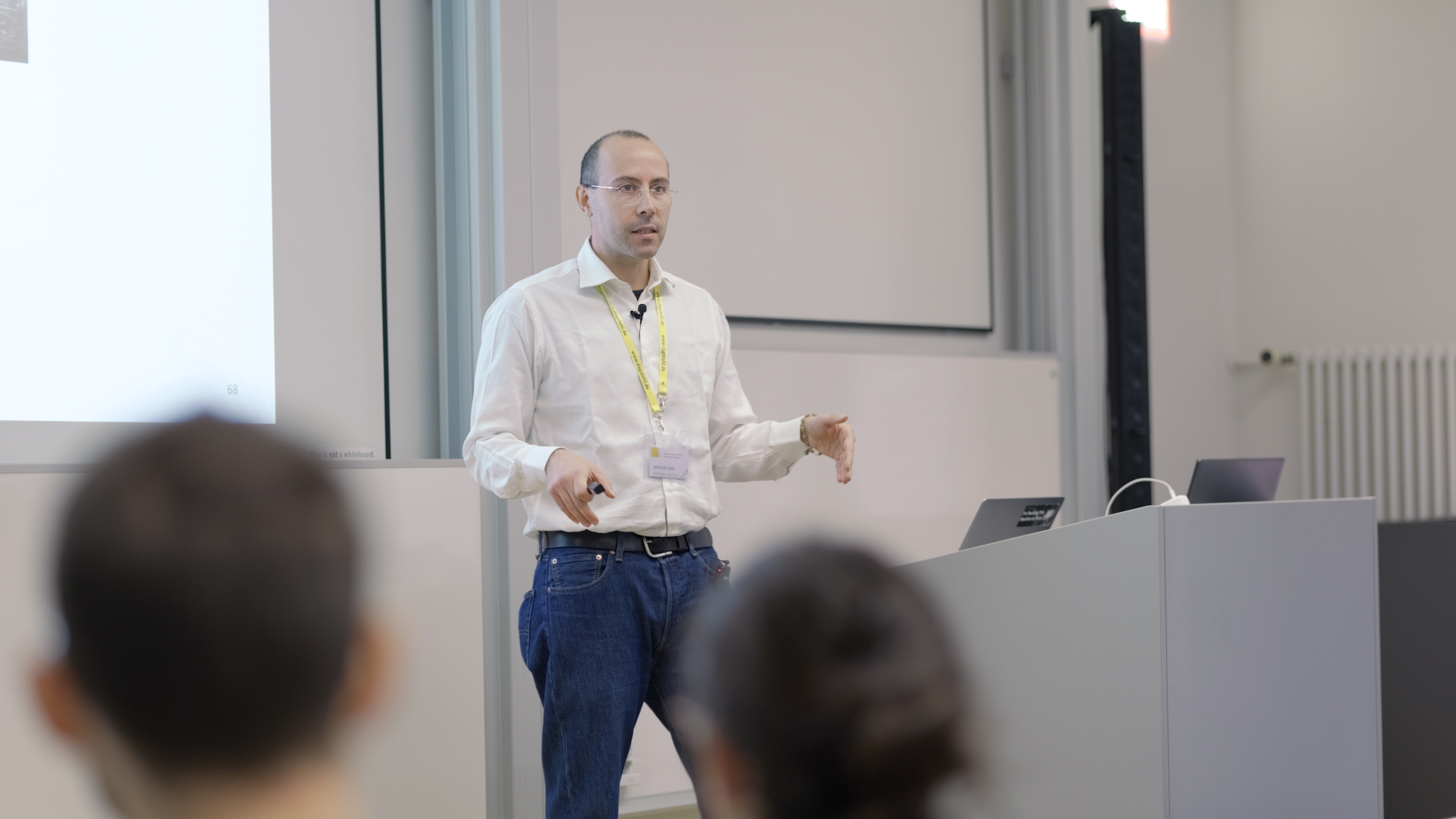
- Antonio Lieto at Schloss Dagstuhl – Leibniz Center for Informatics, Germany, 2024.
- Born: December 18, 1983 (age 42)
- Citizenship: Italy
- Education: University of Salerno
- Scientific career
- Fields: Artificial intelligence Cognitive science
- Workplaces: University of Turin, National Research Council of Italy, University of Salerno
- Website: www.antoniolieto.net

Antonio Lieto (born December 18, 1983) is an Italian cognitive scientist and computer scientist at the University of Salerno and a research associate at the Institute of High Performance Computing of the Italian National Research Council focusing on cognitive architectures and computational models of cognition, commonsense reasoning and models of mental representation, and persuasive technologies. He teaches Artificial Intelligence and "Design and Evaluation of Cognitive Artificial Systems" at the Department of Computer Science of the University of Turin.

== Career and contributions ==
He obtained his PhD from the University of Salerno with a thesis in knowledge representation. and was then a researcher in Artificial Intelligence at the Department of Computer Science of the University of Turin from 2012 to 2023. He is notable for his work on cognitively-inspired computational models of categorization integrating both prototypes and exemplars based strategies through the combination of Peter Gärdenfors conceptual spaces with large scale Description Logics ontologies like Cyc. His model, called DUAL PECCS, has been used to extend the categorization capabilities of different cognitive architectures. He is also notable for the proposal of the Minimal Cognitive Grid as a methodological tool to rank the explanatory power of biologically and cognitively inspired artificial systems, and for the invention, with Gian Luca Pozzato, of a cognitively-inspired probabilistic description logics known as TCL (Typicality-based Compositional Logic) used for automated human-like knowledge invention and generation via conceptual blending and combination. TCL is the reasoning engine of the system METCL (Metaphor Elaboration in Typicality-based Compositional Logics) developed for automatic metaphors generation and identification.

In the context of persuasive technologies he has shown, with Vernero, how arguments reducible to logical fallacies represent a class of widely adopted persuasive techniques in both web and mobile technologies. A 2021 report by the Rand Corporation has confirmed this insight by showing that the use of logical fallacies proposed by Lieto and Vernero is one of the rhetorical strategies for automated persuasion used by the Russian agents to influence the online discourse and spread subversive information in Europe.

Lieto has been visiting researcher at Carnegie Mellon University, at the University of Haifa and at Lund University and has been associate researcher and scientific consultant of the National Research Nuclear University MEPhI (Moscow Engineering Physics Institute). He has founded, in 2013, the international series of workshops AIC on "Artificial Intelligence and Cognition".

== Recognition ==
In 2020, he was awarded the ACM Distinguished Speaker status from the Association for Computing Machinery. In 2018, he was awarded the "Outstanding Research Award" from the BICA society (Biologically Inspired Cognitive Architecture Society) for his contribution in the area of cognitively inspired artificial systems. He was the vice-president of the Italian Association of Cognitive Science. He is deputy editor-in-chief of the Journal of Experimental and Theoretical Artificial Intelligence, member of the scientific board of the journal Cognitive Systems Research (Elsevier) and member of Technical Committee on Cognitive Robotics of the IEEE - Institute of Electrical and Electronics Engineers. Since January 2024 he is an elected member of the Scientific Board of the Italian Association for Artificial Intelligence (AIxIA)

== Publications ==
=== Books ===
- Lieto, A. Cognitive Design for Artificial Minds. (2021) London/New York, Routledge (Taylor and Francis). ISBN 978-1138207929.

=== Edited books ===
- Proceedings of the 7th International Workshop on Artificial Intelligence and Cognition, Manchester, UK, September 10–11, 2019. CEUR Workshop Proceedings 2483, CEUR-WS.org 2019 (Edited with Angelo Cangelosi). http://ceur-ws.org/Vol-2483/
- Proceedings of the 1st International Workshop on Cognition and Artificial Intelligence for Human-Centred Design (CAID 2017 @IJCAI) @ IJCAI 2017, Melbourne, Australia, August 19, 2017. CEUR Workshop Proceedings, Vol. 299 (Edited with Mehul Bhatt). http://ceur-ws.org/Vol-2099/
- Proceedings of the 6th Workshop on Computational Models of Narrative, CMN 2015, Atlanta, USA. Open Access Series in Informatics [OASIcs] Vol. 45.: Schloss Dagstuhl – Leibniz-Zentrum für Informatik GmbH, Dagstuhl 2015 (Edited with Mark Finlayson, Ben Miller, Rémi Ronfard). https://drops.dagstuhl.de/opus/volltexte/2015/5360/pdf/oasics-vol45-cmn2015-complete.pdf
- Artificial Intelligence and Cognition. Proceedings of the First International Workshop AIC 2013" (2013) CEUR Workshop Proceedings, Vol. 1100, pp. 1–145. 2013 (Edited with Marco Cruciani).

=== Other publications ===
- Lieto, A., Pozzato, G., Zoia, S. (2025). The Delta of Thought: Channeling Rivers of Commonsense Knowledge in the Sea of Metaphorical Interpretations. In Proceedings of IJCAI 2025, 34th International Joint Conference on Artificial Intelligence, Montreal. Canada, AAAI Press.
- A Storytelling Robot Managing Persuasive and Ethical Stances via ACT-R: An Exploratory Study. Augello, A, Città, G., Gentile, M. Lieto, A. (2023). International Journal of Social Robotics, 1-17.
- A Description Logic Framework for Commonsense Conceptual Combination Integrating Typicality, Probabilities and Cognitive Heuristics". Lieto, A., Pozzato G., (2020). Journal of Experimental and Theoretical Artificial Intelligence, 32 (5), 769-804.
- The knowledge level in cognitive architectures: Current limitations and possible developments. Lieto, A., Lebiere, C., & Oltramari, A. (2018). Cognitive Systems Research, 48, 39-55.
- Dual-PECCS: a cognitive system for conceptual representation and categorization. Lieto A., Radicioni, D. P., & Rho, V. (2017). Journal of Experimental and Theoretical Artificial Intelligence, 29(2), 433-452.
- Conceptual spaces for cognitive architectures: A Lingua Franca for different levels of representation. Lieto, A., Chella, A., & Frixione, M. (2017). Biologically Inspired Cognitive Architectures, 17, 1-9.
- A common-sense conceptual categorization system integrating heterogeneous proxytypes and the dual process of reasoning. Lieto, A., Radicioni, D. P., & Rho, V. (2015). In Twenty-fourth international joint conference on artificial intelligence.
- Influencing the Others' Minds: An Experimental Evaluation of the Use and Efficacy of Fallacious-Reducible Arguments in Web and Mobile Technologies. Lieto, A., Vernero, F. (2014). PsychNology Journal. 12 (3): 87–105.
