= Regulated Activation Networks =

Regulated Activation Networks(RANs), is a computational cognitive model. This modelling approach is based upon the Principles of Regulated Activation Networks(PRANs), which are summarized as:

- The model must have a dynamic topology.
- The model must be capable creating abstract concepts.
- The model must be able to learn association among the concepts.
- The model must exhibit time-variant activation states.

== See also ==
- Connectionist models.
- Cognitive models.
- Computational Psychology.
- Neural Networks.
- Machine Learning.
- Deep Representations.
- Conceptual Spaces.
- Conceptual Representations.
