= Robotics Collaborative Technology Alliance =

United States research program

The Robotics Collaborative Technology Alliance (R-CTA) was a research program initiated and sponsored by the US Army Research Laboratory. The purpose was to "bring together government, industrial, and academic institutions to address research and development required to enable the deployment of future military unmanned ground vehicle systems ranging in size from man-portables to ground combat vehicles." Collaborative Technology and Research Alliances was a term for partnerships between Army laboratories and centers, private industry and academia for performing research and technology development intended to benefit the US Army. The partnerships were funded by the US Army.

== History ==
Since approximately 1992, the Army ResearchLaboratory has formed a number of partnerships that involved industry, academia and government. One was the Robotic Collaborative Technology Alliance which was formed in 2009. The program was completed in 2018, ending with a capstone event at Camp Lejeune, North Carolina.

== Objectives ==
The goal of R-CTA was development of unmanned systems with a set of intelligence-based capabilities sufficient to enable the teaming of autonomous systems with soldiers. This included robotic systems capable of reasoning about their missions, move through the world in a tactically correct way, observe salient events in the world around them, communicate efficiently with soldiers and other autonomous systems, and perform a variety of mission tasks. R-CTA's objective was to move beyond unmanned systems requiring human supervision such as drones, which were vulnerable due to near-continuous control by a human operator and breakdowns of communications links.

== Research thrusts ==
The R-CTA program was organized around several research areas:

- Semantic perception – perception that understands a basic set of object types important to robotics, moving beyond just what is or is not an obstacle.
- Adaptive behavior generation – combining previously developed robotic navigation planning together with semantic understanding in a cognitive architecture that supports context.
- Meta-cognition – enabling the use of intuitive, human-level commands for soldier-robot communication, and creating shared mental models and situation awareness.
- Machine learning – leveraging new learning techniques to achieve better and faster training of perception and planning algorithms.
- Hybrid cognitive/metric world model – spanning the range from traditional metric data to associated semantic understanding to support a cognitive level of reasoning.

== Participants ==
The research under this program was performed collaboratively by scientists of the US Army Research Laboratory and by scientists and engineers of the following institutions:

- Army Research Lab (ARL)
- Carnegie Mellon University (CMU)
- Florida State University (FSU)
- General Dynamics Land Systems (GDLS)
- Jet Propulsion Laboratory/California Institute of Technology (JPL/Caltech)
- Massachusetts Institute of Technology (MIT)
- QinetiQ North America (QNA)
- University of Central Florida (UCF)
- University of Pennsylvania (UPenn)

== Results ==
Examples of research results developed by the R-CTA program included:

- Distributed solutions for efficiently allocating a set of complex tasks to a robot team, by giving individual robots the ability to come up with new ways to perform a task, or by allowing multiple robots to cooperate by sharing the subcomponents of a task, or both.
- Water detection sensor platforms on an XUV vehicle for terrain classification and obstacle detection in natural environments.
- Short-range sensing for safe driving, including video sensing, laser rangefinders, a novel light-stripe rangefinder, software to process each sensor individually, and a map-based fusion system.
- A Geometric Path Planner (GPP) that produces routes for unmanned ground and air vehicles. The GPP generates plans that calculate factors such as mobility risk, traversal time, sensor coverage, and stealth.
- A multirobot coordination approach that ensures robustness and promotes graceful degradation in team performance when faced with malfunctions, including communication failures, partial robot malfunction, or robot death.
- A method and apparatus for error correction in speech recognition applications through comparison of user utterances.
- A method for mobile range sensing, through detecting the range of at least one object of a scene. The method consisted of receiving a set of images of the scene having multiple objects from at least one camera in motion.
- A method to combine the standard and throat microphone signals for noise-robust speech recognition using an optimum filter algorithm.
