= Minshew =

Minshew is a surname. Notable people with the surname include:

- Alicia Minshew (born 1974), American actress
- Gardner Minshew (born 1996), American football quarterback
- Kathryn Minshew (born 1985), American businesswoman
- Nancy Minshew, American psychiatrist and professor
- Wayne Minshew (1936–2015), American journalist and minor league baseball player
