= 4CAPS =

4CAPS (Cortical Capacity-Constrained Concurrent Activation-based Production System) is a cognitive architecture developed by Marcel A. Just and Sashank Varma at Carnegie Mellon University. It is the successor of the CAPS and 3CAPS cognitive architectures.

== Overview and Assumptions ==
In 4CAPS computations are distributed and dynamically balanced among independent processing centers. Like in other cognitive architectures (e.g., ACT-R), these processing centers have been identified with corresponding cortical regions in the human brain. Performing specific task, such as reading or driving, requires the simultaneous contribution of many of such regions.

Notably, 4CAPS differs from other architectures for its stress on the capacity constraints (that is, limited computational power), and the dynamic collaboration between different centers. In particular, according to Just and Varma, 4CAPS is based on four characteristic assumptions:

1. Each cortical area can perform multiple cognitive functions.
2. Each cortical area has a limited capacity for computational resources.
3. The cortical network of regions that is responsible for carrying out a particular task changes dynamically as the regions' capacity resources are saturated.
4. Communications between cortical regions are also subject to specific constraints, similar to bandwidth limitations along information channels.

== Implementation and Applications ==
Like other cognitive architectures (such as ACT-R, EPIC, and Soar), 4CAPS is implemented as a production system. It is written in the Common Lisp programming language. This system has been used to create computational models for a variety of phenomena, especially in the field of cognitive neuroscience. In particular, 4CAPS models have been created and used to fit behavioral and imaging data for tasks such as the Tower of London, mental rotation, and dual-tasking.
