= Computational model =

Mathematical model of a complex system

A computational model uses computers to simulate and study complex systems in various fields of computational science, spanning from physics, engineering, chemistry and biology to economics, psychology, cognitive science and computer science.

The system under study is often a complex nonlinear system for which simple, intuitive analytical solutions are not readily available. Rather than deriving a mathematical analytical solution to the problem, experimentation with the model is done by adjusting the parameters of the system in the computer, and studying the differences in the outcome of the experiments. Operation theories of the model can be derived/deduced from these computational experiments.

Examples of common computational models are weather forecasting models, earth simulator models, flight simulator models, virtual cells, molecular protein folding models, computational materials models Computational Engineering Models (CEM), and neural network models (example below).

Simplified example of developing and using a neural network model in object detection: The network is trained by multiple images known to depict starfish and sea urchins, which are correlated with "nodes" representing visual features. Starfish match with a ringed texture and star outline, whereas most sea urchins match with a striped texture and oval shape.

The resulting model contains weighted associations between visual features and output categories. Because one training image depicts a ring-textured sea urchin, the model also develops a weak association between ringed texture and sea urchin.

Subsequent run of the model on an input image (left): The network correctly detects the starfish. However, the weak association between ringed texture and sea urchin also gives a weak signal to the latter from one of two intermediate nodes. In addition, a shell not included in the training gives a weak signal for the oval shape, also resulting in a weak signal for the sea urchin output. These weak signals may result in a false positive result for sea urchin.

== See also ==
- Computational engineering
- Computational cognition
- Reversible computing
- Agent-based model
- Artificial neural network
- Computational linguistics
- Data-driven model
- Decision field theory
- Dynamical systems model of cognition
- Membrane computing
- Ontology (information science)
- Programming language theory
- Microscale and macroscale models
