= John E. Laird =

American computer scientist

- Born: March 16, 1954 (age 72); Ann Arbor, Michigan, US

Academic background
- Education: Carnegie Mellon University(PhD); University of Michigan(BS)
- Thesis: Universal Subgoaling
- Doctoral advisor: Allen Newell

Academic work
- Discipline: Computer Science
- Sub-discipline: Cognitive Architectures
- Institutions: University of Michigan; Xerox PARC
- Notable works: The Soar Cognitive Architecture

John Edwin Laird (born March 16, 1954) is a computer scientist who created the Soar cognitive architecture at Carnegie Mellon University with Paul Rosenbloom and Allen Newell. Laird is a professor in the Computer Science and Engineering Division of the Electrical Engineering and Computer Science Department of the University of Michigan.

== Education and career ==
Laird received a BS in Communication and Computer Science from the University of Michigan in 1975 and a Ph.D. in computer science from Carnegie Mellon University in 1983. His Ph.D. thesis advisor was Allen Newell. Laird was a researcher at Xerox PARC in the Intelligent Systems Laboratory from 1984 to 1986; in 1986, he joined the faculty at the University of Michigan.

Laird has continued to research architectures of the mind and to develop and evolve the Soar architecture since his time at CMU. He organizes the annual Soar workshop and participates in the international Soar Research Group. In 1998, he co-founded Soar Technology, a company specializing in creating autonomous AI entities based on Soar; he currently serves on its board of directors. His research interests include cognitive architecture, problem-solving, learning, reinforcement learning, episodic memory, semantic memory, and emotion-inspired processing. He is a Fellow of ACM, the Association for the Advancement of Artificial Intelligence (AAAI), the Cognitive Science Society, and the American Association for the Advancement of Science (AAAS).

== Publications ==
- The Soar Cognitive Architecture, Laird, J. E., 2012, MIT Press.
- The Soar Papers: Readings on Integrated Intelligence, Rosenbloom, Laird, and Newell (1993)
- Soar: An Architecture for General Intelligence, Artificial Intelligence, 33: 1-64. Laird, Rosenbloom, Newell, John and Paul, Allen (1987)
