= Cognitive Systems Research =

- Discipline: Computer Science
- Language: English
- Edited by: Serge Thill and Mog Stapleton

Publication details
- History: 1999–present
- Publisher: Elsevier (The Netherlands)
- Frequency: Quarterly
- Impact factor: 3.523 (2020)

Standard abbreviations
- ISO 4: Cogn. Syst. Res.

Indexing
- ISSN: 1389-0417

Links
- Journal homepage; Online Access

Cognitive Systems Research is a scientific journal that covers all topics in the study of cognitive science, both natural and artificial cognitive systems. Its founding editors-in-chief were Ron Sun, Vasant Honavar, and Gregg Oden (from 1999 to 2014). It is published by Elsevier. The journal publishes 4 issues a year and is abstracted and indexed in Scopus and the Science Citation Index. According to the Journal Citation Reports, its 2020 impact factor is 3.523. The current co-editor-in-chiefs are Serge Thill and Mog Stapleton.
