= Journal of Experimental and Theoretical Artificial Intelligence =

- Discipline: Artificial intelligence
- Language: English
- Edited by: Eric Dietrich

Publication details
- History: 1989-present
- Publisher: Taylor & Francis
- Frequency: Quarterly
- Impact factor: 2.111 (2019)

Standard abbreviations
- ISO 4: J. Exp. Theor. Artif. Intell.

Indexing
- CODEN: JEAIL
- ISSN: 0952-813X (print); 1362-3079 (web)
- LCCN: 91642203
- OCLC no.: 796200100

Links
- Journal homepage; Online access; Online archive

The Journal of Experimental and Theoretical Artificial Intelligence is a quarterly peer-reviewed scientific journal published by Taylor and Francis. It covers all aspects of artificial intelligence and was established in 1989. The editor-in-chief is Eric Dietrich (Binghamton University), the deputy editors-in-chief are Li Pheng Khoo (School of Mechanical & Aerospace Engineering, Nanyang Technological University) and Antonio Lieto (Department of Computer Science, University of Turin).

== Abstracting and indexing ==
The journal is abstracted and indexed in:

- ACM Guide to Computing Literature
- Cambridge Scientific Abstracts
- CompuMath Citation Index
- Current Contents/Engineering, Computing, and Technology
- EBSCO databases
- Inspec
- PsycINFO
- Science Citation Index Expanded
- Scopus
- Zentralblatt MATH

According to the Journal Citation Reports, the journal has a 2020/2021 impact factor of 2.340 .
