= Marcel Just =

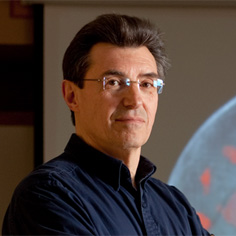
- Occupation: Cognitive Neuroscientist
- Known for: Neurosemantics

Marcel Just is D. O. Hebb Professor of Psychology at Carnegie Mellon University. His research uses brain imaging (fMRI) in high-level cognitive tasks to study the neuroarchitecture of cognition. Just's areas of expertise include psycholinguistics, object recognition, and autism, with particular attention to cognitive and neural substrates. Just directs the Center for Cognitive Brain Imaging and is a member of the Center for the Neural Basis of Cognition at CMU.

== Research ==
=== Mind reading ===
Marcel Just, Tom Mitchell, and colleagues at Carnegie Mellon University are conducting research on "thought identification" using fMRI. Using machine learning techniques, they have been able to identify patterns of brain activation that are reliably associated to the concept of different objects. These signature patterns could be generalized across different participants, so that the authors were able to correctly identify which object a participant was thinking of by analyzing the corresponding brain activation.

A demo of their system was shown on CBS during 60 Minutes.

=== Autism and the underconnectivity hypothesis ===
Just and Nancy Minshew are known for the underconnectivity hypothesis of autism, which posits that autism is marked by underfunctioning high-level neural connections and synchronization, along with an excess of low-level processes. Evidence for this theory has been found in functional neuroimaging studies on autistic individuals and by a brain wave study that suggested that adults with ASD have local overconnectivity in the cortex and weak functional connections between the frontal lobe and the rest of the cortex.

=== Computational cognitive modeling ===
Marcel Just also co-developed with Sashank Varma 4CAPS, a cognitive architecture that specifies how different cortical regions of the brain collaborate to perform specific tasks. 4CAPS model have been used to explain behavioral and brain imaging data in different experimental tasks.
