= Ron Sun =

American computer scientist

- Education: Brandeis University
- Known for: Cognitive architectures, Dual process theory, CLARION cognitive architecture
- Awards: David Marr Award (1991), Hebb Award (2008), Leadership and Vision Award from INNS (2013)
- Scientific career
- Fields: Cognitive science, Artificial intelligence, Computational psychology
- Workplaces: Rensselaer Polytechnic Institute, formerly University of Missouri
- Thesis: (1992)

Ron Sun is a cognitive scientist who has made significant contributions to computational psychology and other areas of cognitive science and artificial intelligence. He is currently professor of cognitive sciences at Rensselaer Polytechnic Institute, and formerly the James C. Dowell Professor of Engineering and Professor of Computer Science at University of Missouri. He received his Ph.D. in 1992 from Brandeis University.

== Overview ==
His many research interests center around the study of human cognition and psychology, especially in the areas of cognitive architectures, human reasoning and learning, cognitive social simulation, and hybrid connectionist-symbolic models. Over the years, his work has been wide-ranging, and spans cognitive science, psychology, philosophy, computer science, artificial intelligence, and social sciences.

He has been known for his work in cognitive modeling (computational psychology). For his paper on integrating rule-based and connectionist models for accounting for human everyday reasoning, he received the 1991 David Marr Award from Cognitive Science Society. For his work on human skill learning, he received the 2008 Hebb Award from the International Neural Network Society. In 2013, he received a Leadership and Vision award from the president of INNS. He is an IEEE Fellow and a fellow of Association for Psychological Science.

He was the founding co-editor-in-chief of the journal Cognitive Systems Research, and serves on the editorial boards of many other journals. He was the general chair and the program chair of CogSci 2006, and the program chair of IJCNN 2007. He was a member of the governing boards of Cognitive Science Society and of International Neural Networks Society. He served as the president of INNS for two years from January 2011 to December 2012.

== Research ==
Throughout the past two decades, he has been conducting research in the fields of computational psychology and hybrid connectionist neural network (i.e., neural symbolic models). In particular, he applied these models to research on human skill acquisition. Specifically, he has worked on the integrated effect of "top-down" and "bottom-up" learning in human skill acquisition, in a variety of task domains, for example, navigation tasks, reasoning tasks, and implicit learning tasks. This inclusion of bottom-up learning processes has been revolutionary in cognitive science, because most previous models of learning had focused exclusively on top-down learning (whereas human learning clearly happens in both directions). This research has culminated with the development of an integrated cognitive architecture that can be used to provide a qualitative and quantitative explanation of empirical psychological learning data. The model, CLARION, is a hybrid neural network that can be used to simulate problem solving and social interactions as well. More importantly, CLARION was the first psychological model that proposed an explanation for the "bottom-up learning" mechanisms present in human skill acquisition: His numerous papers on the subject have brought attention to this neglected area in cognitive science.

Relatedly, he has done pioneering work on dual process theory. Also known as two-system or two-level theories, his dual-process theories posit the co-existence of and the interaction between implicit and explicit processes.

Another strand of his work is a theoretical model of creative problem solving. In this work (with S. Helie), he proposed an integrative theory that is much broader in explanatory scope and used it to account for a range of empirical phenomena.

Yet another strand is what he called cognitive social sciences – the re-unification of the cognitive and social sciences through grounding the social sciences in the cognitive sciences.

He also attempted the difficult task of laying the theoretical and meta-theoretical foundation for computational cognitive modeling (or computational psychology).

== Books ==
- R. Sun, Anatomy of the Mind: Exploring Psychological Mechanisms and Processes with the Clarion Cognitive Architecture. Oxford University Press, New York. 2016.
- R. Sun, (ed.) Grounding Social Sciences in Cognitive Sciences. MIT Press, Cambridge MA. 2012.
- R. Sun, (ed.) The Cambridge Handbook of Computational Psychology. Cambridge University Press, New York. 2008.
- R. Sun, Cognition and Multi-Agent Interaction: From Cognitive Modeling to Social Simulation. Cambridge University Press, New York. 2006.
- R. Sun, Duality of the Mind. Lawrence Erlbaum Associates, Mahwah, NJ. 2002.
- R. Sun and L. Giles, (eds.) Sequence Learning: Paradigms, Algorithms, and Applications. Springer-Verlag, Heidelberg. 2000.
- S. Wermter and R. Sun, (eds.) Hybrid Neural Systems. Springer-Verlag, Heidelberg. 2000.
- R. Sun and F. Alexandre, (eds.) Connectionist-Symbolic Integration. Lawrence Erlbaum Associates, Mahwah, NJ. 1997.
- R. Sun, Integrating Rules and Connectionism for Robust Commonsense Reasoning. John Wiley and Sons, New York. 1994.
- R. Sun & L. Bookman, (eds.), Computational Architectures Integrating Neural and Symbolic Processes. Kluwer Academic Publishers, Needham, MA. 1994.
