= Modular Cognition Framework =

The Modular Cognition Framework (MCF) is an open-ended theoretical framework for research into the way the mind is organized. It draws on the common ground shared by contemporary research in the various areas that are collectively known as cognitive science and is designed to be applicable to all these fields of research. It was established, by Michael Sharwood Smith and John Truscott in the first decade of the 21st century with a particular focus on language cognition when it was known as the MOGUL framework (Modular Online Growth and Use of Language).

The MCF is open-ended in the sense that it has a set of basic principles (see below) describing the architecture of the human mind: these amounts to setting out a skeleton model of the mind and providing a template for cognitive scientists to use. Both mind and brain are viewed as biological phenomena but at different levels of abstraction. These fundamental principles can be further interpreted in various ways by any researcher who is working with a theoretical approach that can be said to reflect, or can be aligned with the basic principles. In doing so researchers can identify their own hypotheses and research findings not only as confirming or challenging their own theory but also as a manifestation of the basic principles underlying all cognitive processing and representation.

By the end of 2020 four books based specifically on the framework had been published along with over 35 articles and chapters; numerous publications and theses by researchers using the MCF for their own purposes had also appeared. This has built on the framework giving it a richer, more elaborate structure in those areas that have been investigated. Nonetheless, different version of the elaborations can still be proposed.

The predominant assumption of the MCF is that the mind is composed of a collaborative network of functionally specialized systems which have evolved over time together with their physical manifestations in the brain that reflect their abstract organization albeit in very different ways. Researchers working in very different areas of cognitive science ought to be able without difficulty to see each other's research as an elaboration of the same framework.

== Basic Principles ==
1. Functional Specialisation. The mind has a modular architecture. This means it has a finite set of functionally specialised cognitive systems such as the auditory system, the motor system and the conceptual system.

2. Mind/Brain Relationship. Cognitive systems are manifested in the physical brain in various, often very different ways. This means that mind and brain, although two side of the same coin, still require distinctly different levels of description and explanation.

3. Representational Diversity. Each system has its own unique operating principles such that its representations are formed in an identifiable manner and in ways that distinguish them from representations in any other system. The structure of any given representation is coded in such a way as to allow it to form more complex representations of the same kind, i.e. within its own system. Primitive representations in each system are the simplest and are provided in advance as part of our biological inheritance. In this way meaning (conceptual) representations can be combined with other conceptual representations to form more complex meanings.

4. Association. These cognitive systems form an interactive network allowing representations in different systems to be associated (but see below).

5. Information Encapsulation. Due to the different codes in which representations of various types are written, one cognitive system cannot share information with another cognitive system. Associated representations of different types can only be associated and coactivated during online processing.

6. Coactivation. In response to current experience, associated representations across the mind as a whole are coactivated in parallel forming temporary online representational networks or schemas.

7.Each Mind is Unique. The way in which combinations of representations of the same type are formed within a given system and the ways in which associations of representations of different types are formed over the lifetime of one individual make the mind of that individual unique. In other words, the fixed architecture of the mind still allows everyone to be different from everyone else and to respond to new experiences in different ways.

9. Acquisition by Processing. Change (development, acquisition, growth) occurs as a result of online processing. This principle is reflected in the following statement: acquisition is the lingering effect of processing (Truscott and Sharwood Smith 2004a), (Truscott and Sharwood Smith 2004).

9. Variable Activation Levels. Cognitive representations are activated online to different degrees and may compete with one another for participation in the building of a more complex representations online. This is partly because they possess a resting level of activation which will rise or decline according to the frequency and regularity with which they are activated. Extremely high levels of activation are associated with phenomena described variously as attention, awareness and consciousness. Higher consciousness, which engages thought processes, is characterised by particularly intense levels of activation. This involves networks of representations (schemas) that simultaneously engage most if not all of the mind's systems. During this widespread, synchronised activity, the content of particular conceptual representations along with all their associated representations in other systems appears in our minds in perceptual form, in our mind's eye as the expression goes. This is achieved via the combined activation of the five sensory perceptual systems. Concepts are thus transformed, or projected into thought processes as percepts.

10. Language versus Linguistic. Human language development and use comes from product of the online interaction of all cognitive systems. However, it qualifies as human language by virtue of one, or two (depending the linguistic-theoretical perspective adopted) functionally specialized systems that have evolved specifically to handle linguistic structure.

== Architecture ==
Each functionally specialized system (module) has a common structure consisting of a store and a processor. This store/processor combination holds for all systems and is a simple, abstract version of what, in its neural manifestation, can involve multiple locations and pathways in the physical brain.

The processor is run according to the special operating principles of the given cognitive system as determined by the theory adopted by researchers in their relevant area of specialization. It controls the creation and combination online of its representations.

The store is where representations are housed at various resting levels of activation and where they are activated.

The mind does not have a single memory where all representations are stored and activated: it has many, that is, one store for each system. In a given store, an activated representation, complex or otherwise, is said to be in that system's working memory(WM). In other words, WM is a state and not a system in its own right ( Cowan 1999). In a more general sense, WM can be thought of as a combination of all the currently activated representations, each in their individual stores.

Representations are also called (cognitive) structures and this is reflected in the abbreviations. Hence a visual representation is called a visual structure and abbreviated as VS. Cognitive systems are linked by interfaces which can be thought of as simple processors that enable the association and coactivation of representations in adjoining systems. The visual/auditory interface, for example, links these two sensory perceptual systems and allows a visual representation to be associated and coactivated with a given auditory representation. Where a visual representation of, say, a tree is associated with the abstract meaning TREE, this would be explained as an association occurring between the visual and conceptual systems, i.e. across the VS/CS interface.

The set of cognitive systems can be conceptualised as consisting of two types. The first, forming an outer ring, consists of the set of perceptual systems that each receive a particular type of raw input (visual, auditory, olfactory etc.) from the external environment via the senses and each produce as their output their own cognitive representations of the world outside. This means that the world that we feel we know as the external world is actually the world that is represented internally in our five perceptual systems. Representations in these systems are collectively known as perceptual output structures (POpS). They are richly connected with one another and capable of the very high activation levels necessary for survival. This makes them an essential part of how conscious experience is to be explained.

The second set of systems at an inner or deeper level are not connected directly with raw input coming in from the environment. They comprise the conceptual system responsible for abstract meanings, the affective system which is responsible for positive and negative values and basic emotions, the motor system and the spatial system. The final system or set of two systems are responsible for creating linguistic structure. The MCF currently uses the two-system alternative following Jackendoff are, respectively, the phonological system which associates specific auditory structures with phonological structures (PS) and the syntactic system which associates syntactic representations (SS) with meanings, i.e. conceptual structures (CS). Similarly, associations are also made between the two linguistic systems at the PS/SS interface. Inevitably the two linguistic systems are richly interconnected along with their direct connections with the conceptual and auditory system and also the visual system as well since it is currently assumed that sign language users make direct associations between visual representations (VS) and representations in the phonological store hence making the phonological system do double duty ( Sandler 1999).

== Notes ==
1. Truscott, J. & M. Sharwood Smith (2004a). Acquisition by processing: a modular perspective on language. Bilingualism: Language and Cognition 7, 1, 1-20.
2. Truscott, J. & M. Sharwood Smith (2004b). How APT is your theory: present status and future prospects. Bilingualism: Language and Cognition 7, 1: 43–47.
3. Sandler W. (2012). The phonological organization of sign languages. Language and linguistics Compass, 6, 3, 162.

== General references ==
- Baars, B. (1988). A Cognitive Theory of Consciousness. New York: Cambridge University Press.
- Baars, B. (1997) In the Theater of Consciousness: The Workspace of the Mind. New York: Oxford University Press.
- Baddeley, A. (2007). Working Memory, Thought, and Action. Oxford: Oxford University Press.
- Chomsky, N. (1965). Aspects of the Theory of Syntax. Cambridge, Mass.: MIT Press.
- Chomsky, N. (1995). The Minimalist Program. Cambridge, Massachusetts: The MIT Press.
- Cowan, N. (1999).An Embedded-Processes Model of Working Memory in A. Miyake & P. Shah (eds.). Models of Working Memory. Cambridge: Cambridge University Press, 63–101.
- Damasio, A. (1999). The Feeling of What Happens: Body, Emotion and the Making of Consciousness. Heinemann: London.
- Dijkstra, A.F.J. & W.J.B. van Heuven (2002). The Architecture of the Bilingual Word Recognition System: From Identification to Decision. Bilingualism: Language and Cognition 5/3. 175–197.
- Green, D.W. (1998). Mental Control of the Bilingual Lexico-Semantic System. Bilingualism: Language and Cognition 1, 67–81.
- Jackendoff, R. (1987). Consciousness and the Computational Mind. Cambridge, MA: MIT Press.
- Jackendoff, R. (2002). Foundations of Language. Oxford: Oxford University Press.
- Paradis, M. (2004). A Neurolinguistic Theory of Bilingualism. Amsterdam: John Benjamins.
- Poeppel, D. (2012). The maps problem and the mapping problem: Two challenges for a cognitive neuroscience of speech and language' Cognitive Neuropsychology. 29, 1-2: 34–55.
- Truscott, J. & M. Sharwood Smith (2004). Acquisition by Processing: a Modular Perspective on Language Development Bilingualism: Language and Cognition 7, 1, 1–2.
