= Cognitive model =

Model of cognition's operation

A cognitive model is a representation of one or more cognitive processes in humans or other animals for the purposes of comprehension and prediction. There are many types of cognitive models, and they can range from box-and-arrow diagrams to a set of equations to software programs that interact with the same tools that humans use to complete tasks (e.g., computer mouse and keyboard). In terms of information processing, cognitive modeling is modeling of human perception, reasoning, memory and action.

Knowledge about the representation of cognitive processes in humans originated in Philosophy. It relies on two opposing philosophical approaches, internalism and externalism, which together explain the nature of the mind and its relation to the body and the external world. From the internalist's perspective, the modeling of human perception, reasoning, memory, and action is independent of the external world. Current academic literature generally categorizes Internalism's cognitive models into three groups of representations of cognitive processes in humans:

- Box-and-Arrow models, these models identify the components involved in cognition;
- Computational Models explain the "rules" that govern how information moves between the structures defined above;
- Dynamical systems focus on how the system changes every instant.

Philosophical ideas of Professors Andy Clark and David Chalmers have developed an externalist approach to modeling cognition, based on the active role of the environment in driving cognitive processes: extended mind thesis. According to this approach, because external objects play a significant role in aiding cognitive processes, the mind and the environment act as a "coupled system" that can be seen as a complete cognitive system of its own. Externalism is represented by the Mother-fetus neurocognitive model, which explains cognitive development in part as a function of the environment.

== Relationship to cognitive architectures ==
Cognitive models can be developed within or without a cognitive architecture, though the two are not always easily distinguishable. In contrast to cognitive architectures, cognitive models tend to be focused on a single cognitive phenomenon or process (e.g., list learning), how two or more processes interact (e.g., visual search and decision making), or making behavioral predictions for a specific task or tool (e.g., how instituting a new software package will affect productivity). Cognitive architectures tend to be focused on the structural properties of the modeled system, and help constrain the development of cognitive models within the architecture. Likewise, model development helps to inform limitations and shortcomings of the architecture. Some of the most popular architectures for cognitive modeling include ACT-R, Clarion, LIDA, and Soar.

== History ==
Cognitive modeling historically developed within cognitive psychology/cognitive science (including human factors), and has received contributions from the fields of machine learning and artificial intelligence among others. However, long before the "Cognitive Revolution" of the 1960s, scientists already began approaching mathematical and mechanical models of the mind. The early contribution to the field was made in 1885. Ludwig Lichtheim proposed an idea (later expanded on by Carl Wernicke) arguably the first prerequisite of the "Box-and-Arrow" model, mapping language processing into specialized "boxes" for auditory recognition and speech production, connected by neural pathways (arrows). He established the Connectionist-Localist paradigm, which holds that complex functions such as language are not located in a single place but result from information flowing between specialized centers. In 1943, Warren McCulloch and Walter Pitts created a mathematical model of a neuron as a set of logic gates to show how the brain could "compute" in their paper "A Logical Calculus of the Ideas Immanent in Nervous Activity". In the same year, Kenneth Craik argued in "The Nature of Explanation" that the brain is a "calculating machine" building internal models of the world. Professors Richard Atkinson and Richard Shiffrin launched the "Box-and-Arrow" era in 1968 with the Atkinson-Shiffrin Multi-Store Model of Memory. This made the "Information-Processing" approach famous by drawing three distinct boxes for memory, describing flow between the sensory register (SR), short-term memory (STM), and long-term memory (LTM). In 1998, Professor van Gelder published the dynamical hypothesis in cognitive science. His dynamical model described how the system's state changes over time using several differential equations based on tracking data of the internal dynamics. The opposite, externalist view on the cognition development was put forward by Latvian professor Igor Val Danilov in his Mother-fetus neurocognitive model in 2024.

== Box-and-arrow models ==
The Box-and-Arrow model represents the mind as a system of functional components (the "boxes") connected by pathways of information flow (the "arrows"). This group of models describes what the mind does without necessarily explaining how the neurons fire. The most influential applications of this model include:

Atkinson-Shiffrin Multi-Store Model (1968): A classic memory theory proposing that information flows through three distinct "boxes": Sensory Memory, Short-Term Memory, and Long-Term Memory.

Broadbent’s Filter Model (1958): One of the earliest "bottleneck" theories of selective attention, using a box-and-arrow diagram to show how sensory information is filtered before reaching higher-level processing.

Baddeley’s Working Memory Model (1974/2000): Refines the "short-term memory box" into a multi-component system including the Central Executive, Phonological Loop, and Visuospatial Sketchpad.

Norman and Shallice (1986) CS/SS Model: A model of cognitive control that uses "boxes" to represent Contention Scheduling (routine actions) and the Supervisory Attentional System (complex tasks).

Three major principles:

Modularity: the mind is composed of separate "modules."

Serial Processing (Directional Flow): information usually moves in a linear, step-by-step fashion.

Discrete Stages: each box completes its job in its entirety before passing the result to the next box. This is the opposite of the Dynamical Systems approach, which sees everything as a continuous, messy overlap.

== Computational models ==
A computational model is a mathematical model in computational science that requires extensive computational resources to study the behavior of a complex system by computer simulation. Computational cognitive models examine cognition and cognitive functions by developing process-based computational models formulated as sets of mathematical equations or computer simulations. The system under study is often a complex nonlinear system for which simple, intuitive analytical solutions are not readily available. Rather than deriving a mathematical analytical solution to the problem, experimentation with the model is done by changing the parameters of the system in the computer, and studying the differences in the outcome of the experiments. Theories of operation of the model can be derived/deduced from these computational experiments. Examples of common computational models are weather forecasting models, earth simulator models, flight simulator models, molecular protein folding models, and neural network models.

=== Symbolic ===
A symbolic model is expressed in characters, usually non-numeric ones, that require translation before they can be used.

=== Subsymbolic ===
A cognitive model is subsymbolic if it is made by constituent entities that are not representations in their turn, e.g., pixels, sound images as perceived by the ear, signal samples; subsymbolic units in neural networks can be considered particular cases of this category.

=== Hybrid ===
Hybrid computers are computers that exhibit features of analog computers and digital computers. The digital component normally serves as the controller and provides logical operations, while the analog component normally serves as a solver of differential equations. See more details at hybrid intelligent system.

== Dynamical systems ==
In the traditional computational approach, representations are viewed as static structures of discrete symbols. Cognition takes place by transforming static symbol structures in discrete, sequential steps. Sensory information is transformed into symbolic inputs, which produce symbolic outputs that get transformed into motor outputs. The entire system operates in an ongoing cycle.

What is missing from this traditional view is that human cognition happens continuously and in real time. Breaking down the processes into discrete time steps may not fully capture this behavior. An alternative approach is to define a system with (1) a state of the system at any given time, (2) a behavior, defined as the change over time in overall state, and (3) a state set or state space, representing the totality of overall states the system could be in. The system is distinguished by the fact that a change in any aspect of the system state depends on other aspects of the same or other system states.

A typical dynamical model is formalized by several differential equations that describe how the system's state changes over time. By doing so, the form of the space of possible trajectories and the internal and external forces that shape a specific trajectory that unfold over time, instead of the physical nature of the underlying mechanisms that manifest this dynamics, carry explanatory force. On this dynamical view, parametric inputs alter the system's intrinsic dynamics, rather than specifying an internal state that describes some external state of affairs.

=== Early dynamical systems ===
==== Associative memory ====
Early work in the application of dynamical systems to cognition can be found in the model of Hopfield networks. These networks were proposed as a model for associative memory. They represent the neural level of memory, modeling systems of around 30 neurons which can be in either an on or off state. By letting the network learn on its own, structure and computational properties naturally arise. Unlike previous models, “memories” can be formed and recalled by inputting a small portion of the entire memory. Time ordering of memories can also be encoded. The behavior of the system is modeled with vectors which can change values, representing different states of the system. This early model was a major step toward a dynamical systems view of human cognition, though many details had yet to be added and more phenomena accounted for.

==== Language acquisition ====
By taking into account the evolutionary development of the human nervous system and the similarity of the brain to other organs, Elman proposed that language and cognition should be treated as a dynamical system rather than a digital symbol processor. Neural networks of the type Elman implemented have come to be known as Elman networks. Instead of treating language as a collection of static lexical items and grammar rules that are learned and then used according to fixed rules, the dynamical systems view defines the lexicon as regions of state space within a dynamical system. Grammar is made up of attractors and repellers that constrain movement in the state space. This means that representations are sensitive to context, with mental representations viewed as trajectories through mental space instead of objects that are constructed and remain static. Elman networks were trained with simple sentences to represent grammar as a dynamical system. Once a basic grammar had been learned, the networks could then parse complex sentences by predicting which words would appear next according to the dynamical model.

==== Cognitive development ====
A classic developmental error has been investigated in the context of dynamical systems: The A-not-B error is proposed to be not a distinct error occurring at a specific age (8 to 10 months), but a feature of a dynamic learning process that is also present in older children. Children 2 years old were found to make an error similar to the A-not-B error when searching for toys hidden in a sandbox. After observing the toy being hidden in location A and repeatedly searching for it there, the 2-year-olds were shown a toy hidden in a new location B. When they looked for the toy, they searched in locations that were biased toward location A. This suggests that there is an ongoing representation of the toy's location that changes over time. The child's past behavior influences its model of locations of the sandbox, and so an account of behavior and learning must take into account how the system of the sandbox and the child's past actions is changing over time.

==== Locomotion ====
One proposed mechanism of a dynamical system comes from analysis of continuous-time recurrent neural networks (CTRNNs). By focusing on the output of the neural networks rather than their states and examining fully interconnected networks, three-neuron central pattern generator (CPG) can be used to represent systems such as leg movements during walking. This CPG contains three motor neurons to control the foot, backward swing, and forward swing effectors of the leg. Outputs of the network represent whether the foot is up or down and how much force is being applied to generate torque in the leg joint. One feature of this pattern is that neuron outputs are either off or on most of the time. Another feature is that the states are quasi-stable, meaning that they will eventually transition to other states. A simple pattern generator circuit like this is proposed to be a building block for a dynamical system. Sets of neurons that simultaneously transition from one quasi-stable state to another are defined as a dynamic module. These modules can in theory be combined to create larger circuits that comprise a complete dynamical system. However, the details of how this combination could occur are not fully worked out.

=== Modern dynamical systems ===
==== Behavioral dynamics ====
Modern formalizations of dynamical systems applied to the study of cognition vary. One such formalization, referred to as “behavioral dynamics”, treats the agent and the environment as a pair of coupled dynamical systems based on classical dynamical systems theory. In this formalization, the information from the environment informs the agent's behavior and the agent's actions modify the environment. In the specific case of perception-action cycles, the coupling of the environment and the agent is formalized by two functions. The first transforms the representation of the agents action into specific patterns of muscle activation that in turn produce forces in the environment. The second function transforms the information from the environment (i.e., patterns of stimulation at the agent's receptors that reflect the environment's current state) into a representation that is useful for controlling the agents actions. Other similar dynamical systems have been proposed (although not developed into a formal framework) in which the agent's nervous systems, the agent's body, and the environment are coupled together.

===== Adaptive behaviors =====
Behavioral dynamics have been applied to locomotive behavior. Modeling locomotion with behavioral dynamics demonstrates that adaptive behaviors could arise from the interactions of an agent and the environment. According to this framework, adaptive behaviors can be captured by two levels of analysis. At the first level of perception and action, an agent and an environment can be conceptualized as a pair of dynamical systems coupled together by the forces the agent applies to the environment and by the structured information provided by the environment. Thus, behavioral dynamics emerge from the agent-environment interaction. At the second level of time evolution, behavior can be expressed as a dynamical system represented as a vector field. In this vector field, attractors reflect stable behavioral solutions, whereas bifurcations reflect changes in behavior. In contrast to previous work on central pattern generators, this framework suggests that stable behavioral patterns are an emergent, self-organizing property of the agent-environment system rather than determined by the structure of either the agent or the environment.

==== Open dynamical systems ====
In an extension of classical dynamical systems theory, rather than coupling the environment's and the agent's dynamical systems to each other, an “open dynamical system” defines a “total system”, an “agent system”, and a mechanism to relate these two systems. The total system is a dynamical system that models an agent in an environment, whereas the agent system is a dynamical system that models an agent's intrinsic dynamics (i.e., the agent's dynamics in the absence of an environment). Importantly, the relation mechanism does not couple the two systems together, but rather continuously modifies the total system into the decoupled agent's total system. By distinguishing between total and agent systems, it is possible to investigate an agent's behavior when it is isolated from the environment and when it is embedded within an environment. This formalization can be seen as a generalization from the classical formalization, whereby the agent system can be viewed as the agent system in an open dynamical system, and the agent coupled to the environment and the environment can be viewed as the total system in an open dynamical system.

===== Embodied cognition =====
In the context of dynamical systems and embodied cognition, representations can be conceptualized as indicators or mediators. In the indicator view, internal states carry information about the existence of an object in the environment, where the state of a system during exposure to an object is the representation of that object. In the mediator view, internal states carry information about the environment which is used by the system in obtaining its goals. In this more complex account, the states of the system carries information that mediates between the information the agent takes in from the environment, and the force exerted on the environment by the agents behavior. The application of open dynamical systems have been discussed for four types of classical embodied cognition examples:

1. Instances where the environment and agent must work together to achieve a goal, referred to as "intimacy". A classic example of intimacy is the behavior of simple agents working to achieve a goal (e.g., insects traversing the environment). The successful completion of the goal relies fully on the coupling of the agent to the environment.
2. Instances where the use of external artifacts improves the performance of tasks relative to performance without these artifacts. The process is referred to as "offloading". A classic example of offloading is the behavior of Scrabble players; people are able to create more words when playing Scrabble if they have the tiles in front of them and are allowed to physically manipulate their arrangement. In this example, the Scrabble tiles allow the agent to offload working memory demands on to the tiles themselves.
3. Instances where a functionally equivalent external artifact replaces functions that are normally performed internally by the agent, which is a special case of offloading. One famous example is that of human (specifically the agents Otto and Inga) navigation in a complex environment with or without assistance of an artifact.
4. Instances where there is not a single agent. The individual agent is part of larger system that contains multiple agents and multiple artifacts. One famous example, formulated by Ed Hutchins in his book Cognition in the Wild, is that of navigating a naval ship.

The interpretations of these examples rely on the following logic: (1) the total system captures embodiment; (2) one or more agent systems capture the intrinsic dynamics of individual agents; (3) the complete behavior of an agent can be understood as a change to the agent's intrinsic dynamics in relation to its situation in the environment; and (4) the paths of an open dynamical system can be interpreted as representational processes. These embodied cognition examples show the importance of studying the emergent dynamics of an agent-environment systems, as well as the intrinsic dynamics of agent systems. Rather than being at odds with traditional cognitive science approaches, dynamical systems are a natural extension of these methods and should be studied in parallel rather than in competition.

=== Critique of dynamical systems ===
The onset of cognitive processes in a naive organism is a critical issue in the apodictic basis of the dynamical system approach. The critique of embodied cognition poses at least two arguments questioning its independence and self-sufficiency. First, the foundation of this dynamical system approach, the dynamical hypothesis in cognitive science, is based on a set of equations. This fact means that to describe each specific system, it is necessary to introduce data on its specific initial conditions: a specific dynamic system cannot be defined without primary data. Indeed, van Gelder's dynamical hypothesis in cognitive science regards the initial conditions. Even though a dynamical system tracks primary data less than it does internal dynamics, according to the hypothesis, it still needs external input of primary data. So, the dynamical system requires external data input to trigger it.

Second, in light of the above difficulty, embodied cognitivists introduced the notion of dynamically embodied information. It refers to the pairing of a stimulus with the particular symbol saved in the sensorimotor neuro-structures and processes that embody meaning (sense).

"Representational "vehicles" are temporally extended patterns of activity that can crisscross the brain-body-world boundaries, and the meanings or contents they embody are brought forth or enacted in the context of the system's structural coupling with its environment."

In a chaos of environmental stimuli, the link between specific stimuli and neural "patterns of activity" is unpredictable, owing to irrelevant stimuli that can be randomly associated with this embodied meaning. This bond is possible only when "the context of the system's structural coupling with its environment" has already been established, which is impossible for the naive organism in an unfamiliar environment. So, the evidence supporting embodiment abounds across the different sciences, yet the interpretation of results and their significance remains disputed, and researchers continue to look for appropriate ways to study and explain embodied cognition. The dynamical systems approach is not the only way to explain cognitive development in early-stage organisms.

== Mother-fetus cognitive model ==
Research on child development inspired a different perspective on the representation of cognitive processes in humans. The mother-fetus neurocognitive model refers to a representation of neurophysiological processes within the biological system of this dyad that prepares the fetal nervous system for proper responses to stimuli at the onset of cognition. By describing cognitive development at earlier stages than other cognitive models (computational models and dynamical systems approaches), it addresses such gaps in our knowledge as the perception-stability problem, the binding problem, the excitatory-inputs problem, and the problem of morphogenesis.

=== The perception stability problem ===
Young organisms at the sensorimotor stage of development cannot capture the same picture of the environment as adults do because of their immature sensory systems. Since the similarity in perception of objects is unlikely to be achieved in these organisms, teaching through interpersonal dynamics is more limited.

The binding problem concerns the lack of knowledge about how organisms at the simple reflex stage of development overcome the threshold of environmental chaos in sensory stimuli. While young organisms need to combine objects, backgrounds, and abstract or emotional features into a single experience to build a surrounding reality, they cannot independently distinguish relevant sensory stimuli. Even the embodied dynamical system approach cannot get around the cue-to-noise problem. This ability requires categorizing the environment into objects that come into being through (and only after) perception and intentionality.

=== The excitatory inputs problem ===
According to the prevailing view in cognitive science, experience-dependent neuronal plasticity underlies cognitive development. Neuronal plasticity relies on the structural organization of excitatory inputs, which supports spike-timing-dependent plasticity, but this remains unknown. Specifically, the relationship between a specific sensory stimulus and the appropriate structural organization of excitatory inputs in specific neurons remains a problem for cognitive models.

=== The problem of morphogenesis ===
According to the received view in biology, cell actions during ontogenesis, including cell contact remodeling, cell migration, cell division, and cell extrusion, need control over cell mechanics. Collinet and Lecuit (2021) posed a question: "What forces or mechanisms at the cellular level manage four very general classes of tissue deformation, namely tissue folding and invagination, tissue flow and extension, tissue hollowing, and, finally, tissue branching"? "How are cell mechanics and associated cell behaviors robustly organized in space and time during tissue morphogenesis"? "What defines the time and length scales of the cell behaviors driving morphogenesis"? Notably, because the nervous system structures underlie everything that makes us human, the formation of neural tissues in a specific way is essential for shaping cognitive functions.

According to the mother-fetus neurocognitive model, the complex process of shaping the nervous system's determined structure requires a complete developmental program with a template for achieving the nervous system's final biological structure. Indeed, even processes of cell coupling that shape a nervous system during embryonic development challenge the naturalistic approach; how the nervous system grasps perception and shapes intentionality (independently, i.e., without any template) seems even more complicated. This model describes the physical interactions between two nervous systems that synchronize neuronal activity in perceiving environmental stimuli. Cognition and emotions develop through the association of affective cues with stimuli that activate neural pathways for simple reflexes, driven by non-local neuronal coupling in synchronized nervous systems. The emotion-reflex stimuli conjunction contributes to the further development of simple innate neuronal assemblies, shaping emotional neuronal patterns in statistical learning that are continuously connected to the neuronal pathways of reflexes.

== See also ==
- Computational cognition
- Computational models of language acquisition
- Computational-representational understanding of mind
- Distributed cognition
- Extended mind thesis
- MindModeling@Home
- Memory-prediction framework
- Social cognition
- Space mapping
