= CLARION (cognitive architecture) =

Connectionist Learning with Adaptive Rule Induction On-line (CLARION) is a computational cognitive architecture that has been used to simulate many domains and tasks in cognitive psychology and social psychology, as well as implementing intelligent systems in artificial intelligence applications. An important feature of CLARION is the distinction between implicit and explicit processes and focusing on capturing the interaction between these two types of processes. The system was created by the research group led by Ron Sun.

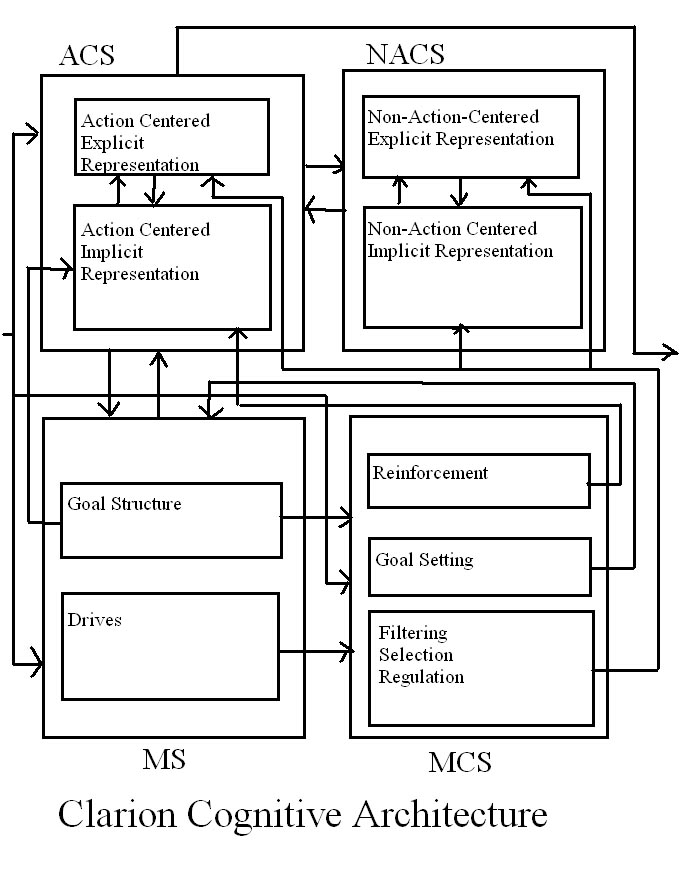
Clarion Framework

== Overview ==
CLARION is an integrative cognitive architecture. It is used to explain and simulate cognitive-psychological phenomena, which could potentially lead to an unified explanation of psychological phenomena. There are three layers to the CLARION theory. The first layer is the core theory of mind. The main theories consists of a number of distinct subsystems, which are the essential structures of CLARION, with a dual representational structure in each subsystem (implicit versus explicit representations). Its subsystems include the action-centered subsystem, the non-action-centered subsystem, the motivational subsystem, and the meta-cognitive subsystem. The second layer consists of the computational models that implements the basic theory; it is more detailed than the first level theory but is still general. The third layer consists of the specific implemented models and simulations of the psychological processes or phenomena. The models of this layer arise from the basic theory and the general computational models.

=== Dual Representational Structure ===
The distinction between implicit and explicit processes is fundamental to the Clarion cognitive architecture. This distinction is primarily motivated by evidence supporting implicit memory and implicit learning. Clarion captures the implicit-explicit distinction independently from the distinction between procedural memory and declarative memory. To capture the implicit-explicit distinction, Clarion postulates two parallel and interacting representational systems capturing implicit an explicit knowledge respectively. Explicit knowledge is associated with localist representation and implicit knowledge with distributed representation.

Explicit knowledge resides in the top level of the architecture, whereas implicit knowledge resides in the bottom level. In both levels, the basic representational units are connectionist nodes, and the two levels differ with respect to the type of encoding. In the top level, knowledge is encoded using localist chunk nodes whereas, in the bottom level, knowledge is encoded in a distributed manner through collections of (micro)feature nodes. Knowledge may be encoded redundantly between the two levels and may be processed in parallel within the two levels. In the top level, information processing involves passing activations among chunk nodes by means of rules and, in the bottom level, information processing involves propagating (micro)feature activations through artificial neural networks. Top-down and bottom-up information flows are enabled by links between the two levels. Such links are established by Clarion chunks, each of which consists of a single chunk node, a collection of (micro)feature nodes, and links between the chunk node and the (micro)feature nodes. In this way a single chunk of knowledge may be expressed in both explicit (i.e., localist) and implicit (i.e., distributed) form, though such dual expression is not always required.

The dual representational structure allows implicit and explicit processes to communicate and, potentially, to encode content redundantly. As a result, Clarion theory can account for various phenomena, such as speed-up effects in learning, verbalization-related performance gains, performance gains in transfer tasks, and the ability to perform similarity-based reasoning, in terms of synergistic interaction between implicit and explicit processes. These interactions involve both the flow of activations within the architecture (e.g., similarity-based reasoning is supported by spreading activation among chunks through shared (micro)features) as well as bottom-up, top-down and parallel learning processes. In bottom-up learning, associations among (micro)features in the bottom level are extracted and encoded as explicit rules. In top-down learning, rules in the top level guide the development of implicit associations in the bottom level. Additionally, learning may be carried out in parallel, touching both implicit and explicit processes simultaneously. Through these learning processes knowledge may be encoded redundantly or in complementary fashion, as dictated by agent history. Synergy effects arise, in part, from the interaction of these learning processes. Another important mechanism for explaining synergy effects is the combination and relative balance of signals from different levels of the architecture. For instance, in one Clarion-based modeling study, it has been proposed that an anxiety-driven imbalance in the relative contributions of implicit versus explicit processes may be the mechanism responsible for performance degradation under pressure.

=== Subsystems ===
The Clarion cognitive architecture consists of four subsystems.

==== Action-centered subsystem ====
The role of the action-centered subsystem is to control both external and internal actions. The implicit layer is made of neural networks called Action Neural Networks, while the explicit layer is made up of action rules. There can be synergy between the two layers, for example learning a skill can be expedited when the agent has to make explicit rules for the procedure at hand. It has been argued that implicit knowledge alone cannot optimize as well as the combination of both explicit and implicit.

==== Non-action-centered subsystem ====
The role of the non-action-centered subsystem is to maintain general knowledge. The implicit layer is made of Associative Neural Networks, while the bottom layer is associative rules. Knowledge is further divided into semantic and episodic, where semantic is generalized knowledge, and episodic is knowledge applicable to more specific situations. It is also important to note since there is an implicit layer, that not all declarative knowledge has to be explicit.

==== Motivational subsystem ====
The role of the motivational subsystem is to provide underlying motivations for perception, action, and cognition. The motivational system in CLARION is made up of drives on the bottom level, and each drive can have varying strengths. There are low level drives, and also high level drives aimed at keeping an agent sustained, purposeful, focused, and adaptive. The explicit layer of the motivational system is composed of goals. Explicit goals are used because they are more stable than implicit motivational states. The CLARION framework views that human motivational processes are highly complex and can't be represented through just explicit representation.

Examples of some low level drives include:

- food
- water
- reproduction
- avoiding unpleasant stimuli (not mutually exclusive of other low level drives, but separate for the possibility of more specific stimuli)

Examples of some high level drives include:

- Affiliation and belongingness
- Recognition and achievement
- Dominance and power
- Fairness

There is also a possibility for derived drives (usually from trying to satisfy primary drives) that can be created by either conditioning, or through external instructions. Each drive needed will have a proportional strength, opportunity will also be taken into account

==== Meta-cognitive subsystem ====
The role of the meta-cognitive subsystem is to monitor, direct, and modify the operations of all the other subsystems. Actions in the meta-cognitive subsystem include: setting goals for the action-centred subsystem, setting parameters for the action and non-action subsystems, and changing an ongoing process in both the action and non-action subsystems.

== Learning ==
Learning can be represented with both explicit and implicit knowledge individually while also representing bottom-up and top-down learning. Learning with implicit knowledge is represented through Q-learning, while learning with just explicit knowledge is represented with one-shot learning such as hypothesis testing. Bottom-up learning is represented through a neural network propagating up to the explicit layer through the Rule-Extraction-Refinement algorithm (RER), while top-down learning can be represented through a variety of ways.

== Comparison with other cognitive architectures ==
To compare with a few other cognitive architectures:

- ACT-R employs a division between procedural and declarative memory that is somewhat similar to CLARION’s distinction between the Action-Centered Subsystem and the Non-Action-Centered Subsystem. However, ACT-R does not have a clear-cut (process-based or representation-based) distinction between implicit and explicit processes, which is a fundamental assumption in the CLARION theory.
- Soar does not include a clear representation-based or process-based difference between implicit and explicit cognition, or between procedural and declarative memory; it is based on the ideas of problem spaces, states, and operators. When there is an outstanding goal on the goal stack, different productions propose different operators and operator preferences for accomplishing the goal.
- EPIC adopts a production system similar to ACT-R’s. However, it does not include the dichotomy of implicit and explicit processes, which is essential in CLARION.

== Theoretical applications ==
CLARION has been used to account for a variety of psychological data, such as the serial reaction time task, the artificial grammar learning task, the process control task, a categorical inference task, an alphabetical arithmetic task, and the Tower of Hanoi task. The serial reaction time and process control tasks are typical implicit learning tasks (mainly involving implicit reactive routines), while the Tower of Hanoi and alphabetic arithmetic are high-level cognitive skill acquisition tasks (with a significant presence of explicit processes). In addition, extensive work has been done on a complex minefield navigation task, which involves complex sequential decision-making. Work on organizational decision tasks and other social simulation tasks, as well as meta-cognitive tasks, has also been initiated.

Other applications of the cognitive architecture include simulation of creativity and addressing the computational basis of consciousness (or artificial consciousness).
