= Nancy Minshew =

American psychiatrist

Nancy Minshew is a Professor of Psychiatry and Neurology at the University of Pittsburgh. She directs the Center of Excellence in Autism Research and is an internationally known expert in the cognitive, neurological, and genetic bases of autism. Minshew was trained as a behavioral child neurologist, and she received an M.D. from the Washington University School of Medicine in St. Louis.

== Underconnectivity hypothesis ==
Minshew and colleague Marcel Just are best known for the underconnectivity hypothesis of autism, which posits that autism is marked by underfunctioning high-level neural connections and synchronization, along with an excess of low-level processes. Evidence for this theory has been found in functional neuroimaging studies on autistic individuals and by a brain wave study that suggested that adults with autism spectrum disorders (ASD) have local overconnectivity in the cortex and weak functional connections between the frontal lobe and the rest of the cortex.
