= Soar (cognitive architecture) =

Symbolic cognitive architecture

Soar is a cognitive architecture, originally created by John Laird, Allen Newell, and Paul Rosenbloom at Carnegie Mellon University.

The goal of the Soar project is to develop the fixed computational building blocks necessary for general intelligent agents – agents that can perform a wide range of tasks and encode, use, and learn all types of knowledge to realize the full range of cognitive capabilities found in humans, such as decision making, problem solving, planning, and natural-language understanding. It is both a theory of what cognition is and a computational implementation of that theory. Since its beginnings in 1983 as John Laird's thesis, it has been widely used by AI researchers to create intelligent agents and cognitive models of different aspects of human behavior. The most current and comprehensive description of Soar is the 2012 book, The Soar Cognitive Architecture.

Rosenbloom continued to serve as co-principal investigator after moving to Stanford University, then to the University of Southern California's Information Sciences Institute. It is now maintained and developed by John Laird's research group at the University of Michigan.

== Theory ==
Soar embodies multiple hypotheses about the computational structures underlying general intelligence, many of which are shared with other cognitive architectures, including ACT-R, which was created by John R. Anderson, and LIDA, which was created by Stan Franklin. Recently, the emphasis on Soar has been on general AI (functionality and efficiency), whereas the emphasis on ACT-R has always been on cognitive modeling (detailed modeling of human cognition).

The original theory of cognition underlying Soar is the Problem Space Hypothesis, which is described in Allen Newell's book, Unified Theories of Cognition. and dates back to one of the first AI systems created, Newell, Simon, and Shaw's Logic Theorist, first presented in 1955 and as the General Problem Solver in 1957. The Problem Space Hypothesis contends that all goal-oriented behavior can be cast as search through a space of possible states (a problem space) while attempting to achieve a goal. At each step, a single operator is selected, and then applied to the agent's current state, which can lead to internal changes, such as retrieval of knowledge from long-term memory or modifications or external actions in the world. (Soar's name is derived from this basic cycle of State, Operator, And Result; however, it is no longer regarded as an acronym.) Inherent to the Problem Space Hypothesis is that all behavior, even a complex activity such as planning, is decomposable into a sequence of selection and application of primitive operators, which when mapped onto human behavior take ~50ms.

A second hypothesis of Soar's theory is that although only a single operator can be selected at each step, forcing a serial bottleneck, the processes of selection and application are implemented through parallel rule firings, which provide context-dependent retrieval of procedural knowledge.

A third hypothesis is that if the knowledge to select or apply an operator is incomplete or uncertain, an impasse arises and the architecture automatically creates a substate. In the substate, the same process of problem solving is recursively used, but with the goal to retrieve or discover knowledge so that decision making can continue. This can lead to a stack of substates, where traditional problem methods, such as planning or hierarchical task decomposition, naturally arise. When results created in the substate resolve the impasse, the substate and its associated structures are removed. The overall approach is called Universal Subgoaling.

These assumptions lead to an architecture that supports three levels of processing. At the lowest level, is bottom-up, parallel, and automatic processing. The next level is the deliberative level, where knowledge from the first level is used to propose, select, and apply a single action. These two levels implement fast, skilled behavior, and roughly correspond to Kahneman's System 1 processing level. More complex behavior arises automatically when knowledge is incomplete or uncertain, through a third level of processing using substates, roughly corresponding to System 2.

A fourth hypothesis in Soar is that the underlying structure is modular, but not in terms of task or capability based modules, such as planning or language, but instead as task independent modules including: a decision making module; memory modules (short-term spatial/visual and working memories; long-term procedural, declarative, and episodic memories), learning mechanisms associated with all long-term memories; and perceptual and motor modules. There are further assumptions about the specific properties of these memories described below, including that all learning is online and incremental.

A fifth hypothesis is that memory elements (except those in the spatial/visual memory) are represented as symbolic, relational structures. The hypothesis that a symbolic system is necessary for general intelligence is known as the physical symbol system hypothesis. An important evolution in Soar is that all symbolic structures have associated statistical metadata (such as information on recency and frequency of use, or expected future reward) that influences retrieval, maintenance, and learning of the symbolic structures.

== Architecture ==
=== Processing cycle – decision procedure ===
Soar's main processing cycle arises from the interaction between procedural memory (its knowledge about how to do things) and working memory (its representation of the current situation) to support the selection and application of operators. Information in working memory is represented as a symbolic graph structure, rooted in a state. The knowledge in procedural memory is represented as if-then rules (sets of conditions and actions), that are continually matched against the contents of working memory. When the conditions of a rule matches structures in working memory, it fires and performs its actions. This combination of rules and working memory is also called a production system. In contrast to most production systems, in Soar, all rules that match, fire in parallel.

Instead of having the selection of a single rule being the crux of decision making, Soar's decision making occurs through the selection and applications of operators, that are proposed, evaluated, and applied by rules. An operator is proposed by rules that test the current state and create a representation of the operator in working memory as well as an acceptable preference, which indicates that the operator should be considered for selection and application. Additional rules match with the proposed operator and create additional preferences that compare and evaluate it against other proposed operators. The preferences are analyzed by a decision procedure, which selects the preferred operator and installs it as the current operator in working memory. Rules that match the current operator then fire to apply it and make changes to working memory. The changes to working memory can be simple inferences, queries for retrieval from Soar's long-term semantic or episodic memories, commands to the motor system to perform actions in an environment, or interactions with the Spatial Visual System (SVS), which is working memory's interface to perception. These changes to working memory lead to new operators being proposed and evaluated, followed by the selection of one and its application.

=== Reinforcement learning ===
Soar supports reinforcement learning, which tunes the values of rules that create numeric preferences for evaluating operators, based on reward. To provide maximal flexibility, there is a structure in working memory where reward is created.

=== Impasses, substates, and chunking ===
If the preferences for the operators are insufficient to specify the selection of a single operator, or there are insufficient rules to apply an operator, an impasse arises. In response to an impasse, a substate is created in working memory, with the goal being to resolve the impasse. Additional procedural knowledge can then propose and select operators in the substate to gain more knowledge, and either create preferences in the original state or modify that state so the impasse is resolved. Substates provide a means for on-demand complex reasoning, including hierarchical task decomposition, planning, and access to the declarative long-term memories. Once the impasse is resolved, all of the structures in the substate are removed except for any results. Soar's chunking mechanism compiles the processing in the substate which led to results into rules. In the future, the learned rules automatically fire in similar situations so that no impasse arises, incrementally converting complex reasoning into automatic/reactive processing. Recently, the overall Universal Subgoaling procedure has been extended through a mechanism of goal-directed and automatic knowledge base augmentation that allows to solve an impasse by recombining, in an innovative and problem-oriented way, the knowledge possessed by a Soar agent.

=== Symbolic input and output ===
Symbolic input and output occurs through working memory structures attached to the top state called the input-link and the output-link. If structures are created on the output-link in working memory, these are translated into commands for external actions (e.g., motor control).

=== Spatial visual system and mental imagery ===
To support interaction with vision systems and non-symbolic reasoning, Soar has its Spatial Visual System (SVS). SVS internally represents the world as a scene graph, a collection of objects and component subobjects each with spatial properties such as shape, location, pose, relative position, and scale. A Soar agent using SVS can create filters to automatically extract features and relations from its scene graph, which are then added to working memory. In addition, a Soar agent can add structures to SVS and use it for mental imagery. For example, an agent can create a hypothetical object in SVS at a given location and query to see if it collides with any perceived objects.

=== Semantic memory ===
Semantic Memory (SMEM) in Soar is designed to be a very large long-term memory of fact-like structures. Data in SMEM is represented as directed cyclic graphs. Structures can be stored or retrieved by rules that create commands in a reserved area of working memory. Retrieved structures are added to working memory.

SMEM structures have activation values that represent the frequency or recency of usage of each memory, implementing the base-level activation scheme originally developed for ACT-R. During retrieval, the structure in SMEM that matches the query and has the highest activation is retrieved. Soar also supports spreading activation, where activation spreads from SMEM structures that have been retrieved into working memory to other long-term memories that they are linked to. These memories in turn spread activation to their neighbor memories, with some decay. Spreading activation is a mechanism for allowing the current context to influence retrievals from semantic memory.

=== Episodic memory ===
Episodic Memory (EPMEM) automatically records snapshots of working memory in a temporal stream. Prior episodes can be retrieved into working memory through query. Once an episode has been retrieved, the next (or previous) episode can then be retrieved. An agent may employ EPMEM to sequentially play through episodes from its past (allowing it to predict the effects of actions), retrieve specific memories, or query for episodes possessing certain memory structures.

=== Learning ===
Each of Soar's long-term memories have associated online learning mechanisms that create new structures or modify metadata based on an agent's experience. For example, Soar learns new rules for procedural memory through a process called chunking and uses reinforcement learning to tune rules involved in the selection of operators.

== Agent development ==
The standard approach to developing an agent in Soar starts with writing rules that are loaded into procedural memory, and initializing semantic memory with appropriate declarative knowledge. The process of agent development is explained in detail in the official Soar manual as well as in several tutorials which are provided at the research group's website.

== Software ==
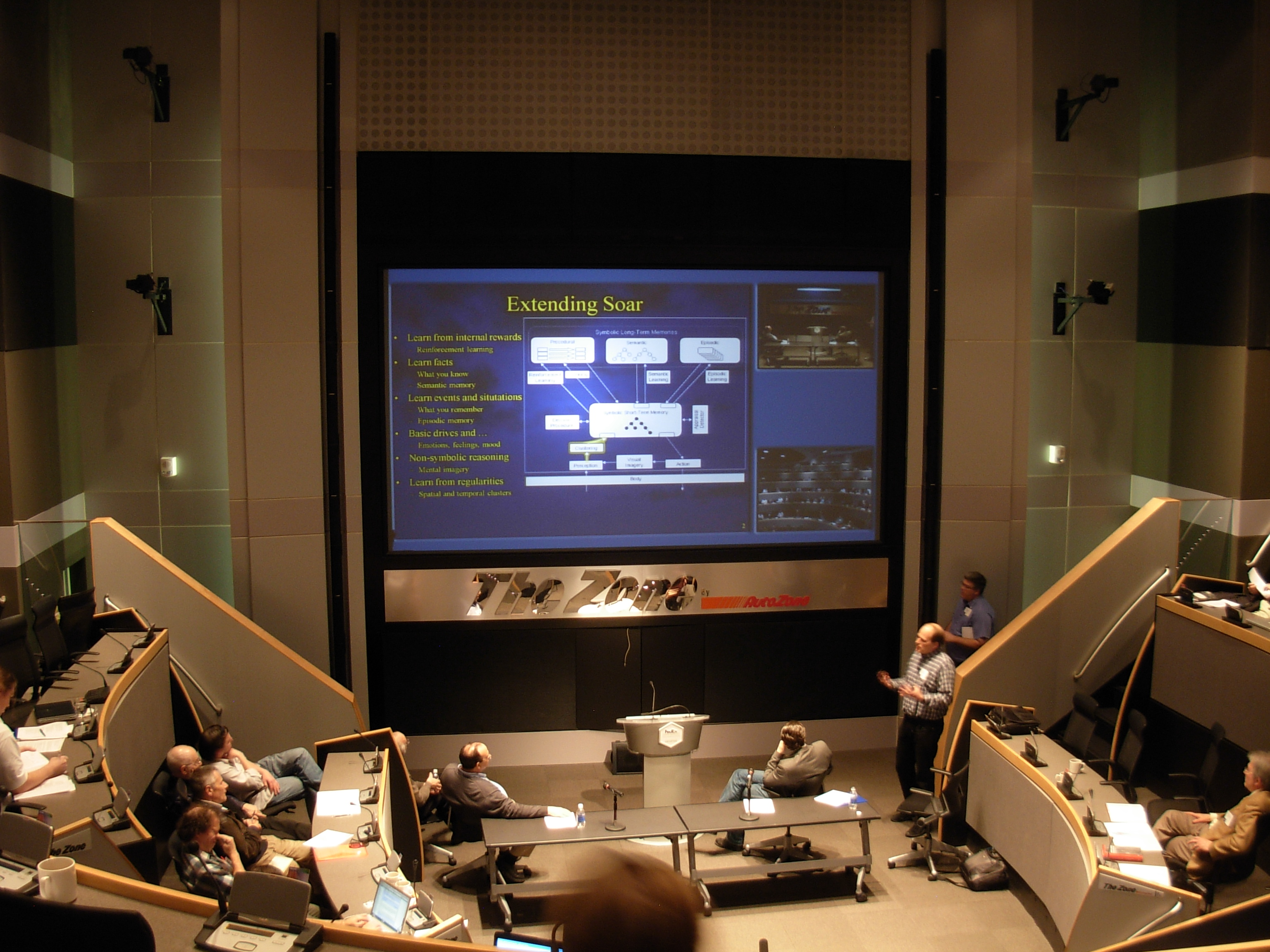
Extending the Soar Cognitive Architecture by John Laird, 2008.

The Soar architecture is currently maintained and extended by the Center for Integrated Cognition (CIC), a research group led by John Laird and Robert Wray. The current architecture is written in a combination of C and C++, and is freely available (BSD license) at the project's website.

Soar can interface with external language environments including C++, Java, Tcl, and Python through SWIG-based bindings included with its distribution. The bindings use a communication protocol based on the Soar Markup Language (SML). SML is a primary mechanism for creating instances of Soar agents and interacting with their I/O links.

The Soar distribution also includes several Java-based tools, including a debugger, an editor, and several environments used in the Soar tutorial.

JSoar is an implementation of Soar written in Java. It is maintained by SoarTech, an AI research and development company. JSoar closely follows the University of Michigan architecture implementation, although it generally does not reflect the latest developments and changes of that C/C++ version.

== Applications ==
Below is a historical list of different areas of applications that have been implemented in Soar. There have been over a hundred systems implemented in Soar, although the vast majority of them are toy tasks or puzzles.

=== Puzzles and games ===
Throughout its history, Soar has been used to implement a wide variety of classic AI puzzles and games, such as Tower of Hanoi, Water Jug, Tic Tac Toe, Eight Puzzle, Missionaries and Cannibals, and variations of the Blocks world. One of the initial achievements of Soar was showing that many different weak methods would naturally arise from the task knowledge that was encoded in it, a property called, the Universal Weak Method.

=== Computer configuration ===
The first large-scale application of Soar was R1-Soar, a partial reimplementation by Paul Rosenbloom of the R1 (XCON) expert system John McDermott developed for configuring DEC computers. R1-Soar demonstrated the ability of Soar to scale to moderate-size problems, use hierarchical task decomposition and planning, and convert deliberate planning and problem solving to reactive execution through chunking.

=== Natural-language understanding ===
NL-Soar was a natural-language understanding system developed in Soar by Jill Fain Lehman, Rick Lewis, Julie Van Dyke, Nancy Green, Robert Rubinoff, Deryle Lonsdale and Greg Nelson. It included capabilities for natural-language comprehension, generation, and dialogue, emphasizing real-time incremental parsing and generation. NL-Soar was used in an experimental version of TacAir-Soar and in NTD-Soar.

=== Simulated pilots ===
The second large-scale application of Soar involved developing agents for use in training in large-scale distributed simulation. Two major systems for flying U.S. tactical air missions were co-developed at the University of Michigan and Information Sciences Institute (ISI) of University of Southern California. The Michigan system was called TacAir-Soar and flew (in simulation) fixed-wing U. S. military tactical missions (such as close-air support, strikes, CAPs, refueling, and SEAD missions). The ISI system was called RWA-Soar and flew rotary-wing (helicopter) missions. Some of the capabilities incorporated in TacAir-Soar and RWA-Soar were attention, situational awareness and adaptation, real-time planning and dynamic replanning, and complex communication, coordination, and cooperation among combinations of Soar agents and humans. These systems participated in DARPA's Synthetic Theater of War (STOW-97) Advanced Concept Technology Demonstration (ACTD), which at the time was the largest fielding of synthetic agents in a joint battlespace over a 48-hour period, and involved training of active duty personnel. These systems demonstrated the viability of using AI agents for large-scale training.

=== STEAM ===
One of the important outgrowths of the RWA-Soar project was the development of STEAM by Milind Tambe, a framework for flexible teamwork in which agents maintained models of their teammates using the joint intentions framework by Cohen & Levesque.

=== NTD-Soar ===
NTD-Soar was a simulation of the NASA Test Director (NTD), the person responsible for coordinating the preparation of the NASA Space Shuttle before launch. It was an integrated cognitive model that incorporated many different complex cognitive capabilities including natural-language processing, attention and visual search, and problem solving in a broad agent model.

=== Virtual humans ===
Soar has been used to simulate virtual humans supporting face-to-face dialogues and collaboration within a virtual world developed at the Institute of Creative Technology at USC. Virtual humans have integrated capabilities of perception, natural-language understanding, emotions, body control, and action, among others.

=== Game AIs and mobile apps ===
Game AI agents have been built using Soar for games such as StarCraft, Quake II, Descent 3, Unreal Tournament, and Minecraft, supporting capabilities such as spatial reasoning, real-time strategy, and opponent anticipation. AI agents have also been created for video games including Infinite Mario which used reinforcement learning, and Frogger II, Space Invaders, and Fast Eddie, which used both reinforcement learning and mental imagery.

Soar can run natively on mobile devices. A mobile application for the game Liar's Dice has been developed for iOS which runs the Soar architecture directly from the phone as the engine for opponent AIs.

=== Robotics ===
Many different robotic applications have been built using Soar since the original Robo-Soar was implemented in 1991 for controlling a Puma robot arm. These have ranged from mobile robot control to humanoid service REEM robots, taskable robotic mules and unmanned underwater vehicles.

=== Interactive task learning ===
A current focus of research and development in the Soar community is Interactive Task Learning (ITL), the automatic learning of new tasks, environment features, behavioral constraints, and other specifications through natural instructor interaction. Research in ITL has been applied to tabletop game playing and multi-room navigation.

=== Scheduling ===
Early on, Merle-Soar demonstrated how Soar could learn a complex scheduling task modeled after the lead human scheduler in a windshield production plant located near Pittsburgh. Later, a generalized version of Merle-Soar (Dispatcher-Soar) was used to demonstrate a symbolic, constraint propagation approach in learning to improve schedules and to define task-independent knowledge metrics of architecture-specific learning -- knowledge efficiency, knowledge utility, and knowledge effectiveness.

=== Music ===
Melody-Soar demonstrated how the Soar architecture could explain and demonstrate creativity in simple melody generation using hierarchies of problems spaces that parallel the hierarchical structure of melody, allowing unique melodies to be generated from preferences of existing styles (e.g., Bach).

== See also ==
- Cognitive Architecture
- ACT-R

== Bibliography ==
- Laird, 2012 The Soar Cognitive Architecture
- Lehman, Laird, and Rosenbloom, 2006 A Gentle Introduction to Soar: 2006 update
- Rosenbloom, Laird, and Newell, 1993 The Soar Papers: Readings on Integrated Intelligence, Information Sciences Institute
