= Outline of open educational resources =

Overview of and topical guide to open educational resources

This outline of open educational resources provides a way of navigating concepts and topics in relation to the open educational resources (OER) movement.

== Definitions ==
=== Concepts of open ===
- Gratis vs. libre
- Free cultural work and Free content
- Open content
- Openness
- Digital freedom
- Libre knowledge
- Open knowledge

=== Relationship to other educational concepts ===
- Open education
- Adult Education
- Self-directed Learning
- Prior Learning Assessment (PLA/PLAR)
- Distance Education
- Online Education

=== Goals and aims ===
- The Cape Town Open Education Declaration (2007)
- UNESCO 2012 Paris OER Declaration
- 2009 Dakar Declaration on Open Educational Resources
- Berlin Declaration on Open Access to Knowledge in the Sciences and Humanities

=== How to design learning using OER ===
- Personal Growth
- Professional Development
- Formal Instructional Design

== Tools ==
=== Access and delivery ===
- Open access
- OpenCourseWare
- Distance learning
- Virtual learning environment
- Open format

=== Learning ===
- Open educational resources (OER)
- Recursos educativos abiertos (OER in Spanish)
- OER Commons
- Connexions
- Open textbooks
- Open content
- MIT OpenCourseWare
- Open access journals
- Learning objects

=== Licensing ===
- Creative Commons license
- Open Content License
- GNU Free Documentation License
- Copyleft

== Methods/Philosophy ==
- Open learning
- Open educational practices
- Connectivism
- Heutagogy
- Open supported learning
- Flexible learning
- E-learning theory

== Types of learning experiences ==
- MOOCs
- Personal learning environments
- Networked learning
- Blended learning
- Virtual learning environment
- Purpose-centered learning

== Programs and initiatives ==
- Athabasca University in Canada
- OER initiatives
- Open university
- OER Foundation
- OER Universitas
- OER Africa
- Khan Academy
- Open University in the United Kingdom
- The Saylor Foundation
- Wikibooks
- Wikiversity
- WikiEducator
- Open.Michigan
- Commonwealth of Learning
- Open Learning for Development

== Governance, policies and standards ==
- Open educational resources policy
- Open-door academic policy
- United Kingdom Accreditation Service
- 2011 Commonwealth of Learning and UNESCO Guidelines on Open Educational Resources in Higher Education
- 2011 Commonwealth of Learning and UNESCO A Basic Guide to Open Educational Resources
