= Wikiversity =

Wikimedia wiki for learning materials

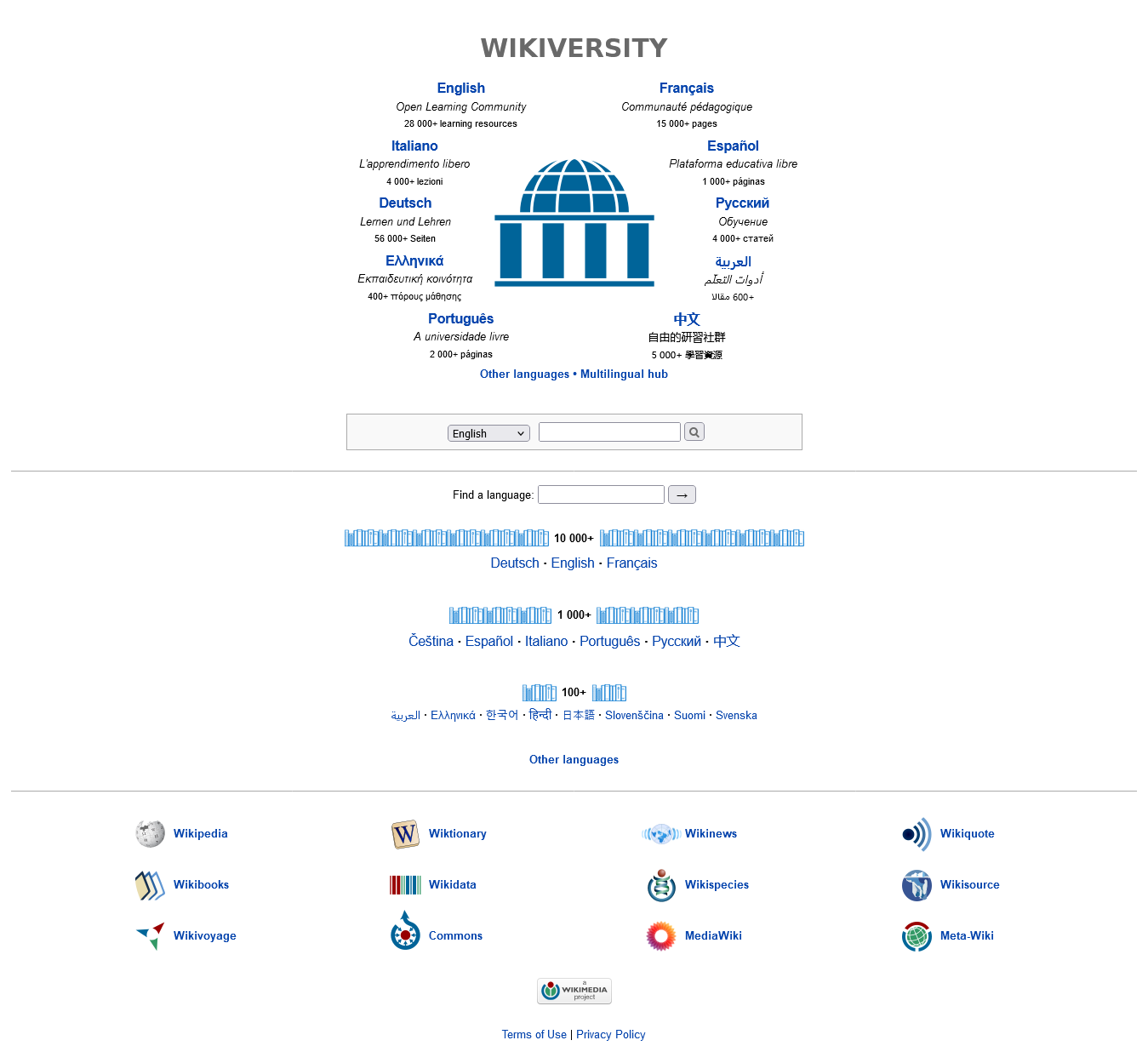
- Screenshot Screenshot of the Wikiversity home page
- Website type: Educational, self study
- Available in: Multilingual (18 active)
- Owner: Wikimedia Foundation
- Creator: Wikimedia community
- Website: wikiversity.org
- Commercial: No
- Registration: Optional
- Launched: August 15, 2006; 20 years ago

Wikiversity is a Wikimedia Foundation project that supports learning communities, their learning materials, and resulting activities. It differs from Wikipedia in that it offers tutorials and other materials for the fostering of learning, rather than an encyclopedia. It is available in many languages.

One element of Wikiversity is a set of WikiJournals which publish peer-reviewed articles in a stable, indexed, and citable format comparable with academic journals. These can be copied to Wikipedia, and are sometimes based on Wikipedia articles.

There are Wikiversity sites active for 18 languages comprising a total of 168,897 articles and 1,056 recently active editors.

== History ==
Wikiversity's data phase officially began on August 15, 2006, with the English language Wikiversity.

The idea of Wikiversity began with the initial development of the Wikiversity community within the Wikibooks project. However, when it was nominated for deletion from Wikibooks, soon there was a proposal to make Wikiversity an independent Wikimedia project, with the fundamental goal to broaden the scope of activities within the Wikimedia community to include additional types of learning resources in addition to textbooks.

Two proposals were made. The first project proposal was not approved (2005) and the second, modified proposal, was approved (2006). The launch of Wikiversity was announced at Wikimania 2006.

== Project details ==
Wikiversity is a center for the creation of and use of free learning materials, and the provision of learning activities. Wikiversity is one of many wikis used in educational contexts, as well as many initiatives that are creating free and open educational resources.

The primary priorities and goals for Wikiversity are to:

- Create and host a range of free-content, multilingual learning materials/resources, for all age groups in all languages.
- Host scholarly/learning projects and communities that support these materials.

The Wikiversity e-Learning model places emphasis on "learning groups" and "learning by doing". Wikiversity's motto and slogan is "set learning free", indicating that groups/communities of Wikiversity participants will engage in learning projects. Learning is facilitated through collaboration on projects that are detailed, outlined, summarized or results reported by editing Wikiversity pages. Wikiversity learning projects include collections of wiki webpages concerned with the exploration of a particular topic. Wikiversity participants are encouraged to express their learning goals, and the Wikiversity community collaborates to develop learning activities and projects to accommodate those goals. The Wikiversity e-Learning activities give learners the opportunity to build knowledge. Students have to be language-aware in order to be able to correct their classmates. By doing this, students develop their reflection skills. Secondly, they enable students to be autonomous deciding what to write or edit, also when and how to do it. Students are able to free resort to any mean of support. At the same time, it fosters cognitive development, engaging students to collaborate.

Wikiversity "administrators" are known as "curators", "custodians", and "bureaucrats" based on their user rights.

== Learning resources ==
Learning resources are developed by an individual or groups, either on their own initiative, or as part of a learning project. Wikiversity resources include teaching aids, lesson plans, curricula, links to off-site resources, course notes, example and problem sets, computer simulations, reading lists, and other as devised by participants – but do not include final polished textbooks. Texts useful to others are hosted at Wikibooks for update and maintenance. Learning groups with interests in each subject area create a web of resources that form the basis of discussions and activities at Wikiversity. Learning resources can be used by educators outside of Wikiversity for their own purposes, under the terms of the GFDL and a Creative Commons license (like Wikipedia).

== Research ==
Wikiversity also allows original research (in contrast to Wikipedia which does not). Such research content may lack any peer review.

=== WikiJournals ===
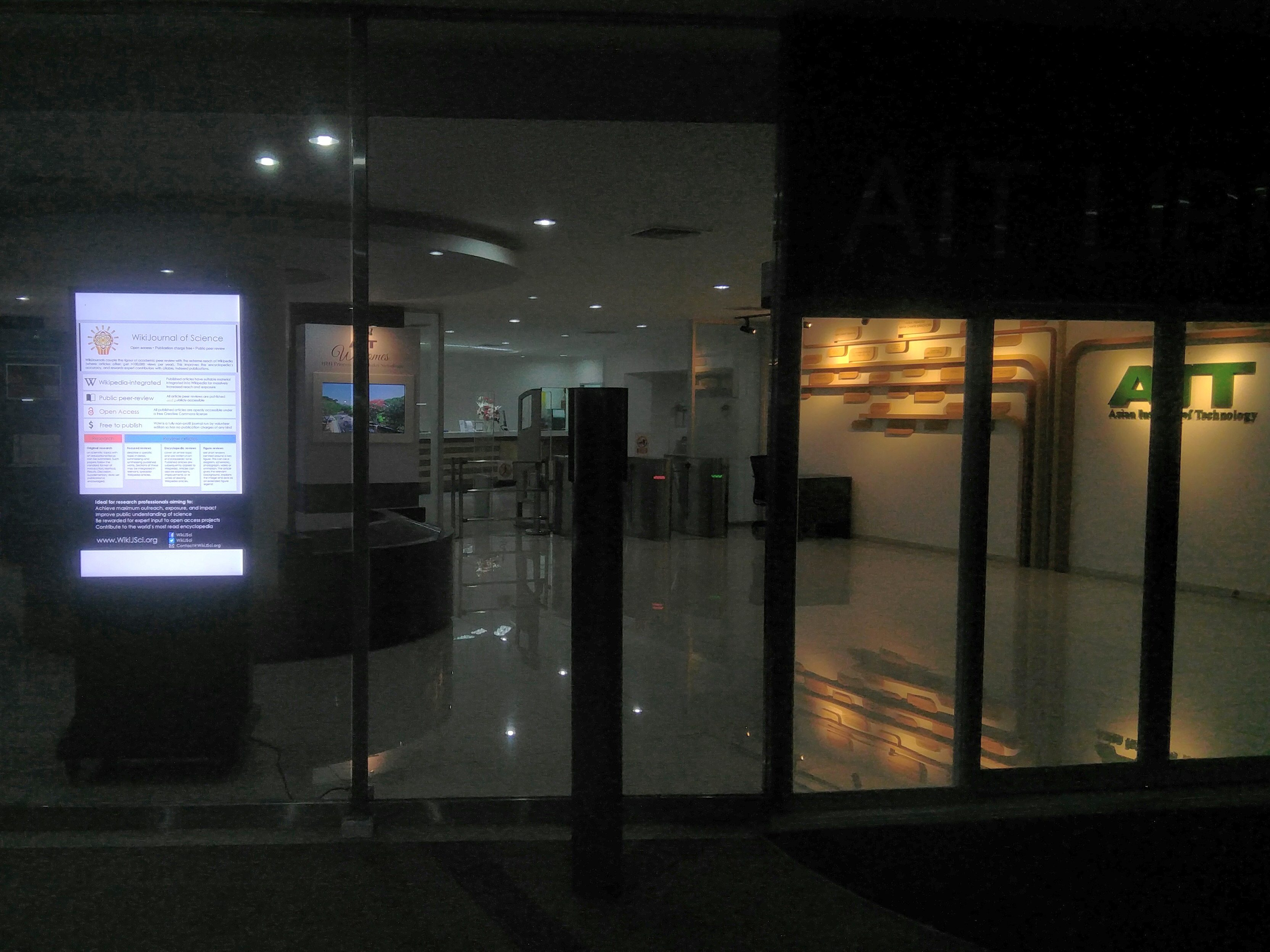
WikiJournal of Science on display at Athlone Institute of Technology Library, 2019

Several WikiJournals operate with an academic journal format on the Wikiversity website (under the WikiJournal User Group). Submitted articles are subjected to peer review by external experts before publication of an indexed, citable, stable version in the journal, and an editable version in Wikipedia. They are wholly free, offering open access to readers and charging no publication fee to authors (diamond open access). Some articles are written from scratch, and others are adapted from Wikipedia articles. They therefore aim to encourage experts to contribute content creation and improvement (as authors and peer reviewers), and provide an additional quality control mechanism for existing Wikipedia content. This activity started with WikiJournal of Medicine in 2014. The sister journals WikiJournal of Science and WikiJournal of Humanities both began publishing in 2018. The WikiJournal User Group received an open publishing award in November 2019.

== Languages ==
There are currently seventeen different Wikiversities: Arabic, Chinese, Czech, English, Finnish, French, German, Greek, Hindi, Italian, Japanese, Korean, Portuguese, Russian, Slovene, Spanish, and Swedish (locked since 17 June 2021); Wikiversity projects in other languages are being developed at the "beta" multilingual hub.

For newly established specific language Wikiversities to move out of the initial exploratory "beta" phase, the new Wikiversity community must establish policies governing research activities. Wikiversity may act as a repository of research carried out by the Wikimedia Research Network, or others who are involved in wiki-based, or other research. Wikiversity hosts original research in addition to secondary research, unless a specific language group decides upon no research. It is expected that researchers will respect and update guidelines for appropriate research through a community consensus process. Currently the English Wikiversity hosts more than 376 research pages.

As of November 2026, there are wikiversity sites for 18 languages of which 18 are active and 0 are closed. The active sites have 168,897 articles, There are 3,597,670 registered users of which 1,056 are recently active.

The top ten Wikiversity language projects by mainspace article count:

№	Language	Wiki	Content pages	Pages	Edits	Admins	Users	Active users	Files
1	German	de	78,810	151,151	1,119,808	9	42,013	101	2,728
2	English	en	37,602	245,426	2,815,483	12	3,112,407	322	42,986
3	French	fr	17,642	55,065	988,301	8	81,120	72	83
4	Chinese	zh	6,967	18,006	372,302	4	21,312	157	0
5	Portuguese	pt	5,516	27,863	188,942	3	45,494	208	88
6	Italian	it	5,442	28,560	288,380	3	46,897	21	10
7	Czech	cs	4,592	14,452	150,988	4	18,949	22	1
8	Russian	ru	4,252	22,670	165,518	3	37,096	17	405
9	Spanish	es	2,408	15,815	183,413	3	62,875	26	0
10		beta	1,152	20,705	384,358	7	55,902	35	0

For a complete list with totals see Wikimedia Statistics:

== Reception ==
PCWorld reported the Wikiversity project in 2007, when the most popular course was on film-making. It compared the project to Massachusetts Institute of Technology's "MIT OpenCourseWare", noting however that while free, MIT's offering was "not free enough for Wikiversity".

In their 2008 book on Empowering Online Learning, Curtis Bonk and Ke Zhang noted that if "the Wikimedia Foundation can nurture credible resources and communities within Wikiversity, it will send serious shock waves throughout higher education." Steven Hoffman, in his 2010 book on teaching humanities, wrote that Wikiversity could do for higher education what Wikipedia had done "for the traditional encyclopedia". Hoffman noted that Wikiversity courses could look much like traditional online university courses, except that they were open in every sense. He did not expect Wikiversity to replace traditional universities, but could supplement them for "retiring baby boomers" spending time and energy on "education as leisure".

The Association for Psychological Science noted in 2018 that Wikipedia, often "Internet users' first source of information", is constantly changing in search of accuracy, accompanied in this by Wikiversity, its "lesser-known sister site".

J. Rapp et al., writing in 2019, commented that Wikiversity allowed readers to become active contributors; writing materials "can be regarded as a learning task for advanced Wikiversity authors in general." They noted that the Wikijournals differed from conventional journals in being transparent about reviewers' backgrounds, possibly facilitating interdisciplinary discussion, and in revealing the stages in the development of an article (by versioning).

== See also ==
- OpenStax
- OpenLearn
- WikiEducator
- Wiki Education Foundation
- Wikipedia:Wikipedia for Schools
- WikiJournal User Group
