= List of PCF Forums =

The Pan-Commonwealth Forum on Open Learning (PCF) is a recurring international conference organized by the Commonwealth of Learning (COL) in collaboration with host institutions across the Commonwealth. This event is regarded as a key forum for open and distance learning experts

Established in 1999, the forum aims to foster dialogue and collaboration among policymakers, educators, and practitioners to promote open and distance learning (ODL) as a means of advancing sustainable development and educational access. Held every two or three years, the PCF serves as a platform for sharing innovations, research, and best practices in education across Commonwealth nations.

== Pan-Commonwealth Forum (PCF) history ==
Previous Forum Locations
Number	Location	Dates
First PCF Forum	Bandar Seri Begawan, Brunei Darussalam	1–5 March 1999
Second PCF Forum	Durban, South Africa	29 July to 2 August 2002
Third PCF Forum	Dunedin, New Zealand	4–8 July 2004
Fourth PCF Forum	Ocho Rios, Jamaica	30 October – 3 November, 2006
Fifth PCF Forum	(United Kingdom) London, UK	13–17 July 2008
Sixth PCF Forum	Kochi, India	24–28 November 2010
Seventh PCF Forum	Abuja, Nigeria	2–6 December 2013
Eighth PCF Forum	Kuala Lumpur, Malaysia	27–30 November 2016
Ninth PCF Forum	Edinburgh, Scotland	9–12 September 2019
Tenth PCF Forum	Calgary, Canada	14–16 September 2022
Eleventh PCF Forum	Gaberone, Botswana	10–12 September 2025
