= Collaborative economy =

Collaborative economy may refer to:

- Collaborative consumption
- Sharing economy
- Commons-based peer production or simply Peer production
