= Open Education Resource Foundation =

Organisation based in New Zealand

The Open Education Resource Foundation is a New Zealand open educational organisation that supports the following projects:

- Open Educational Resource university (OERu)
- WikiEducator (MediaWiki based online courses)

== See also ==
- Open educational resources
- William and Flora Hewlett Foundation
