= LibreTexts =

Open access educational resource collection

- Website type: Open educational resources
- Available in: English, Spanish, Ukrainian
- Country of origin: United States
- Owner: LibreTexts
- Founder: Delmar Larsen
- Website: libretexts.org
- Commercial: No
- Registration: Contents publicly accessible. Registration required only for contributing instructors.
- Launched: 2008
- Current status: Active
- Content license: Creative Commons with some exceptions
- Written in: Mindtouch platform

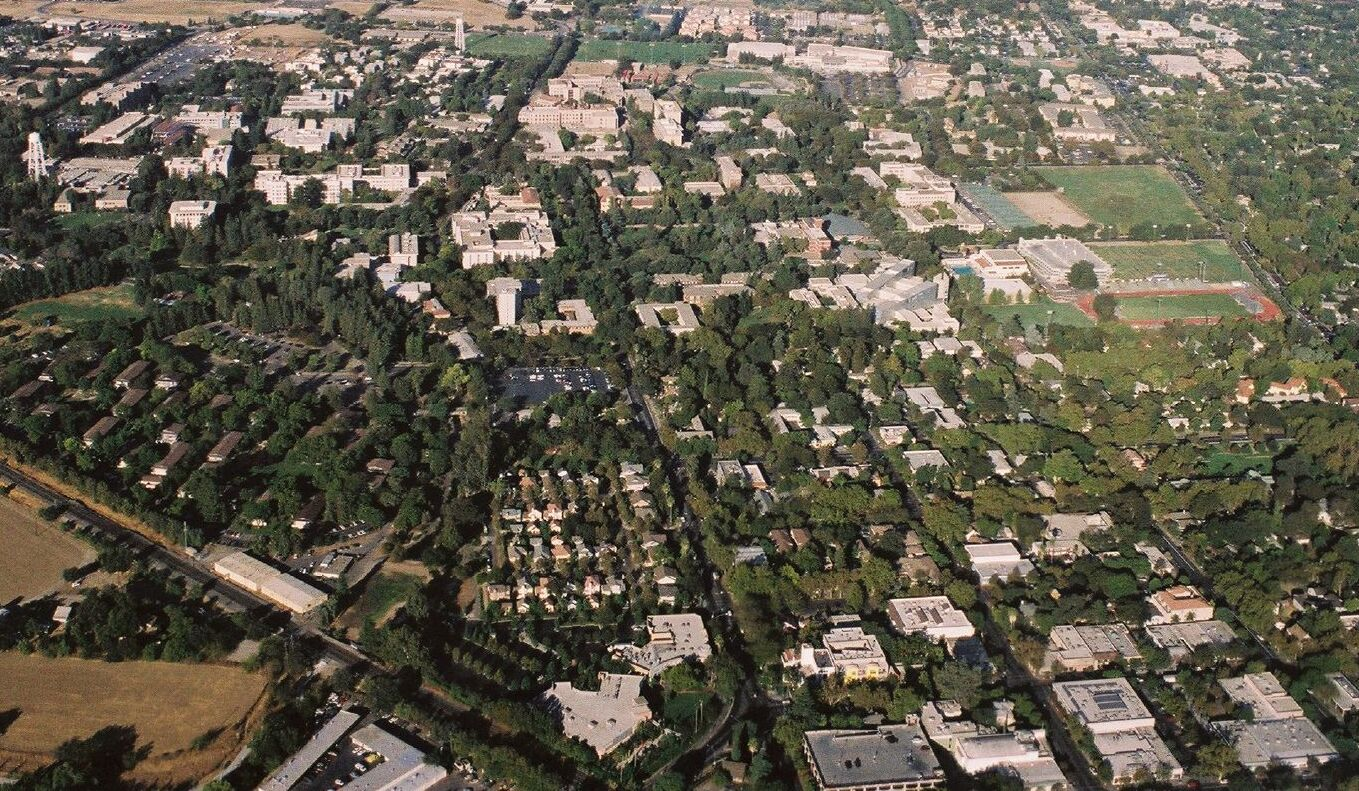
University of California Davis

LibreTexts (formerly called STEMHyperlibrary and ChemWiki) is a 501(c)(3) nonprofit online educational resource project. The project provides open access to its content on its website, and the site is built on the proprietary Mindtouch platform. LibreTexts was started in 2008 by Professor Delmar Larsen at the University of California Davis and has since expanded to 400 texts in 154 courses (as of 2018), making it one of the largest and most visited online educational resources. LibreTexts currently has 13 library disciplines.

== Support ==
LibreTexts' current primary support is from the 2018 Open Textbook Pilot Program award from the Department of Education Organization Act. FIPSE Other funding comes from the University of California Davis, the University of California Davis Library, and the California State University System both through MERLOT and its Affordable Learning Solutions (AL$) program.

== Libraries ==
LibreTexts' content is currently categorized by topic across 16 different "libraries":

- Biology
- Business
- Chemistry
- Engineering
- Español (Spanish)
- Geosciences
- Global (multi-lingual)
- Health
- Humanities
- K-12 Education
- Mathematics
- Physics
- Social Sciences
- Statistics
- Ukrayinska (Ukrainian)
- Workforce

== See also ==
- OpenStax
