= Virginia Open Education Foundation =

US not-for-profit corporation

Virginia Open Education Foundation (VOEF) is a not-for-profit 501(c)(3) corporation that promotes open education to bring curriculum and educational content to the K-12 students of the Commonwealth of Virginia. It was started and is currently directed by Middlesex County Public Schools Technology Director Mark Burnet.

== Virginia Open Textbook Project ==
VOEF aims to establish a Creative Commons database of educational resources produced by private and public funding and aligned to the Virginia Standards of Learning. These resources would then be used by individual school systems through print on demand technology for paper textbooks and would be accessible online through content management systems. The foundation advocates that switching to open source content would lower costs, improve student access to materials, and give local schools more control over instructional content.

== Legislative efforts ==
In January 2007 VOEF worked with State Delegate Christopher Peace to propose to the House of the General Assembly Joint Resolution 702, which would form a joint subcommittee to consider open education implementation in the Commonwealth. This bill was eventually scrapped in favor of an Open Education Resources advisory committee within the Joint Commission on Technology and Science. This committee first met in Richmond on June 20, 2007. Members were interested in lowering costs, providing materials to a broader group of learners, and speeding the process of content distribution via electronic delivery and print on demand.

For the 2008 session, a full subcommittee was formed. An early priority was to unlock some of the production and procurement processes for school textbooks in both K-12 and higher education. To this end, VOEF submitted a proposal to Peace that culminated in work by the Virginia Department of Education to create Virginia House Bill 137, which redefined textbooks to include all electronic versions so as to remove restrictions to paper-bound volumes. The bill passed unanimously in every vote, and was signed by Governor Tim Kaine on March 7, 2008.

In conjunction with VOEF, Chris Peace introduced two more bills in January 2009. The first, HB1940, would authorize the establishment of open education resource centers. Such centers would be able to be either privately or publicly funded, but the legislation would expire if no funding is provided within two years. The second, HB1941, is a proposal that would encourage educational materials produced by the state to be released under a Creative Commons license.

== See also ==
- Open educational resources
- Cape Town Open Education Declaration
