= OpenStax =

Educational technology initiative

- Website type: Open educational resources
- Available in: English, Spanish, Polish
- Headquarters: Rice University; Houston, Texas, United States
- Owner: Rice University
- Revenue: Nonprofit funded by foundation grants and commercial services
- Website: openstax.org
- Launched: 2012
- Current status: Active
- Content license: Creative Commons Attribution 4.0 International

OpenStax (formerly OpenStax College) is a nonprofit educational technology initiative based at Rice University that produces peer-reviewed, openly licensed textbooks for undergraduate education.

Founded in 2012, OpenStax publishes digital textbooks and low-cost print editions under Creative Commons licenses, with the goal of reducing the cost of higher education. Their materials are used internationally across a wide range of disciplines including science, mathematics, social sciences, and business.

== History ==
OpenStax has created peer-reviewed, openly licensed textbooks, which are available as free downloadable PDFs, web versions, audiobooks and for a low cost in print. Most books are also available in Kindle versions on Amazon.com and in the iBooks Store. OpenStax's first textbook was College Physics, which was published online, in print, and in iBooks in 2012. OpenStax launched OpenStax Tutor Beta in June 2017, adaptive courseware based on cognitive science principles, machine learning, and OpenStax content. However, it was announced in October 2022 that Tutor was being discontinued.

The initiative was positioned as an alternative to traditional commercial textbook publishing, and was initially funded by the Bill and Melinda Gates Foundation, the William and Flora Hewlett Foundation, the Michelson 20 Million Minds Foundation, and the Maxfield Foundation. All textbook content is licensed under Creative Commons Attribution Licenses. Formerly, the majority of books were available under the CC BY, although OpenStax has now standardised all of its textbook licences to CC BY-NC-SA.

In 2017, OpenStax announced that they were partnering with UK Open Textbooks to spread the use of their open content in the UK, and partnering with Katalyst Education to form OpenStax Polska, bringing Polish-language versions of select OpenStax books to universities in Poland.

As of January 2024, OpenStax reported that their products have saved $2.9 billion in education costs since 2012, and that 7 million students from 150 countries and 70 percent of higher education institutions in the US use OpenStax.

== Editorial process ==
While OpenStax textbooks undergo peer review prior to publication, like many large-scale educational resources they are periodically revised to address reported errors and clarify content. OpenStax maintains a public errata process and releases updated editions when substantive revisions are made.

The free, online version of OpenStax books are kept up-to-date on an ongoing basis. Instructors are invited to submit errata suggestions via the OpenStax website, and errata suggestions are reviewed by subject matter experts. Revisions are made when it is determined to be pedagogically necessary. New PDFs and print versions of the books are released each summer when substantial changes are present.

OpenStax's original goal was to publish openly licensed textbooks for the 25 highest-enrolled undergraduate college courses: they achieved that goal in 2016. In September 2020 they announced plans to double the number of textbooks they offer.

== See also ==
- LibreTexts
- Open educational resources
- OpenCourseWare
- OpenStax CNX
- Open Course Library
- Open.Michigan
- Rice University Press, Rice's all-digital platform based on the Connexions technology
- Wikiversity, a Wikimedia Foundation project, devoted to learning materials and activities
