= Free Syrian University =

The Free Syrian University was established in 2013 to address the increasing amount of college aged refugees who lack education as a result of the ongoing Syrian Uprising. The university is of secular orientation and not affiliated with any particular faith, although it does contain a College of Sharia, providing undergraduate degrees in Sunni Islamic Law. The university does strongly support the Syrian Revolution, "with both its name and its mandate from the Free Syrian Legal Authority, a type of clearinghouse organization that proves the organization functions with the blessing of the Free Syrian Army— [which] is directly connected to the armed resistance against the Assad regime."

The university's mission statement is “to prepare educated generations who seek to build a country of law and justice and institutions.”

== History ==
The university's founder, Musab Al-Jamal, was a former law professor from Damascus University, Syria. He joined other faculty who were driven out from the war torn country to lecture students in liberated regions in the nation and neighboring countries. In 2012, Al-Jamal, along with several former classmates who attended Damascus University in the 1970s, fled for Turkey when the initially peaceful uprising descended into violence. It was then that Al-Jamal and his former classmates thought of establishing the Free Syrian University.

== Campus ==
Offering a mix of both on-campus and online teaching, the campus is located in an apartment building in Reyhanli, a Turkish town near the Syrian border. Since much of the refugee population, including both students and faculty, still remains in Syria, the university offers lessons via Skype, Facebook and email. This is part of what the founder terms an "open-learning" approach.

== Organization and administration ==
=== Governance ===
The university has found support from professors among the Syrian diaspora living in Europe, who have offered to teach classes in Turkey and from abroad through the Internet. In total there are 32 professors in Reyhanli, and more than 60 throughout the world, all Syrian nationals.

The university's curriculum is “a combination of the old regime curriculum and new information from Sweden and Germany in particular." It also includes English courses each semester.

=== Finances ===
The university is mainly funded by its founder and a host of academic volunteers donating their time and expertise to the cause. The founder gives them a one-time payment of $1,500 when they sign up. A modest fee structure is in place with students inside Syria charged $280 per semester and those outside $560. More than 90 percent of students are unable to pay anything and attend classes for free.

== Academics ==
The university is organized into ten separate academic units (colleges) with the only campus in Reyhanli. The following colleges are:

- College of Media
- College of Law
- College of International Relations and Diplomacy
- College of Engineering
- College of Education
- College of Islamic sharia
- College of Liberal Arts
- College of Middle Eastern Studies
- College of Business
- College of Information Technology

== Enrollment ==
The Free Syrian University has formally enrolled 870 students in Turkey and has hundreds more on digital mailing lists inside Syria and other neighboring countries, mostly in Jordan.

== Name change ==
On 26 February 2025, the institution officially changed its name from Free Syrian University to International Suleiman University as part of a broader restructuring and modernization plan aimed at expanding its academic programs, strengthening international partnerships, and obtaining formal licensing in Turkey. The university stated that the new name reflects its updated institutional identity and its vision to operate as a global educational organization.
