= Norwegian Digital Learning Arena =

Norwegian educational organization

Norwegian Digital Learning Arena (NDLA)
- Founded: 2007
- Type: Non-profit organization
- Purpose: Education
- Location: Norway
- Region served: Norway
- Services: Open educational resources
- Website: ndla.no

Norwegian Digital Learning Arena (NDLA) (Norwegian: Nasjonal digital læringsarena, lit. 'National Digital Learning Arena') is a joint county enterprise offering open digital learning assets for upper secondary education. In addition to being a compilation of open educational resources (OER), NDLA provides a range of other online tools for sharing and cooperation. The legal liability for the joint county programme is carried by Vestland County Council.

NDLA does not take on its own employees, but manages co-workers within the county resource system, as well as co-workers from private sector. Core activities are organised in teams: Subject material development, technical development, applications management, content management, NDLA interactive, and desk support.

== History ==
In 2006 The Norwegian Ministry of Education and Research allocated NOK 50 mill for the development of digital learning resources for subjects in secondary education. Among the targets was the intention to enhance the access to and use of digital learning resources in secondary education, and increase the volume and the variety of such resources. Increased volume and diversity were seen as significant conditions for the introduction of free learning material in upper secondary education. The incentive was an amendment imposing the counties to provide free educational material, in print as well as digital, including digital hardware.

20 September 2006 the county chief executives of education agreed to establish a joint project to develop digital subject material for all subjects in secondary education. The project was named Norwegian Digital Learning Arena (NDLA). The preliminary project work started early 2007; all counties except Oslo were parts of the collaboration. The first year the project was fully funded by the Ministry of Education and Research, and on 26 September Prime Minister Jens Stoltenberg officially opened Norwegian Digital Learning Arena. The academic year 2008–2009 subject material for Norwegian, natural science, and health and social care, first year course, was published.

The 18 participating counties took over the further funding of the project, and for the academic year 2009–2010 digital subject material was provided for 17 curricula and more than 30 subject areas. The extent increases by the year and by school start in 2014 subject material covering approximately 40 curricula and 60 subject areas within upper secondary education is available.

In 2013 Akershus County decided to withdraw from the project, however, the county resumed its participation from January 2014.

The number of visits to the digital learning resources on ndla.no has been rising since the start of the project. Based on ratings by Google Analytics the figures are:

- 2010: 1 431 017
- 2011: 2 876 541
- 2012: 4 799 181
- 2013: 7 022 812
- 2014: 8 200 000
- 2015 10 000 000
- 2016: 11 800 000
- 2017: 12 400 000
- 2018*: 12 900 000
- 2019*: 13 900 000

Oslo County does not take part in the NDLA project.

Screenshots of ndla.no front page

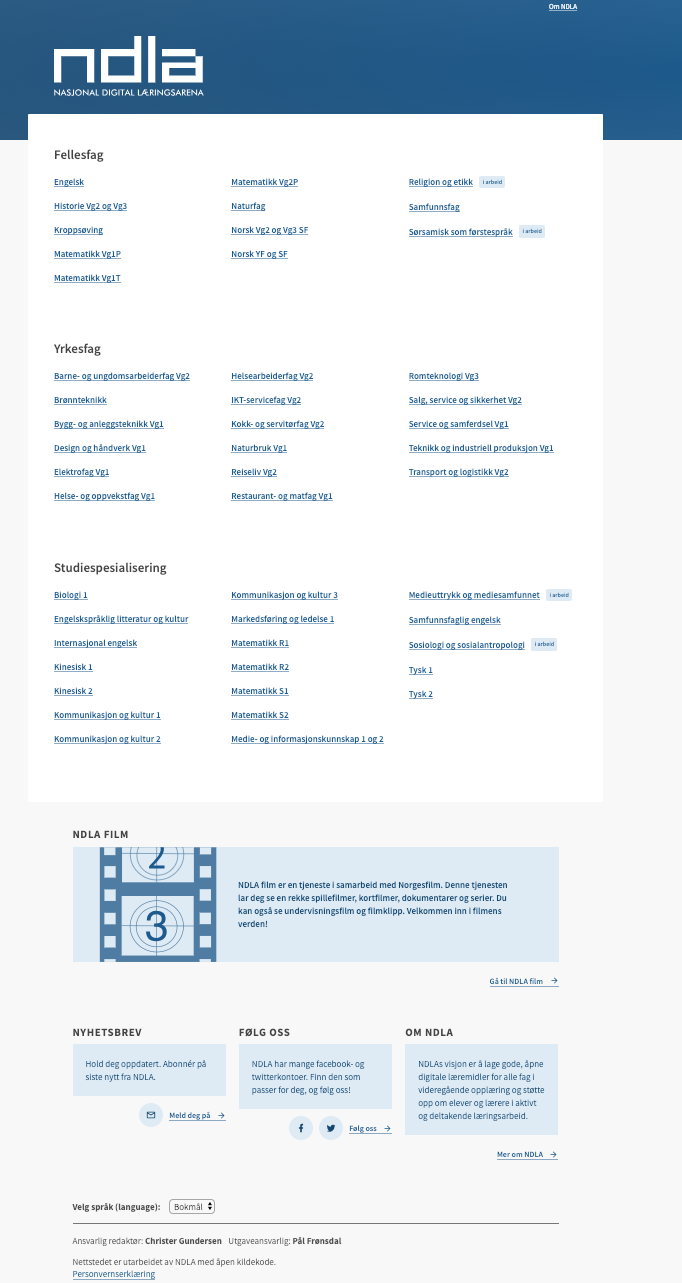
Year 2018–2019

== Available Subject Areas ==
Most of the available NDLA material is licensed by Creative Commons license and is free to use. All the material is noted with competence aims based on the official data from the Norwegian Directorate for Education and Training. By the start of academic year 2014 teaching material within the following subjects and subject areas are available:

- Basic general subjects
  - English
  - Physical education
  - Mathematics
    - Mathematics 1st year course, practical
    - Mathematics 1st year course, theoretical
    - Mathematics 2nd year course, practical
  - Natural science
  - Norwegian
  - Social science
  - History 2nd and 3rd year course (not completed)
- Vocational education
  - Design and crafts 1st year course
  - Electrical studies 1st year course (not completed)
  - Health and adolescence 1st year course
    - Infancy and youth studies 2nd and 3rd year courses
    - Health worker studies 2nd and 3rd year courses
  - Restaurant and nutrition studies 1st year course
    - Cooking and steward studies 2nd year course (not completed)
  - Space technology 3rd year course
  - Service and Transport 1st year course
    - ICT service studies 2nd year course
    - Tourism 2nd year course
    - Business, service and safety 2nd year course
    - Transport and logistics 2nd year course
  - Technology and industrial production 1st year course
- Academic levels
  - Biology 1
  - English
  - English literature and culture 3rd year course
  - International English 2nd year course
  - English social studies 3rd year course
  - Communication and culture 1, 2,3
  - Marketing and management
  - Mathematics
    - Mathematics R1
    - Mathematics R2
    - Mathematics S1
    - Mathematics S2
    - Media and information studies 1 and 2

== Other Services ==
In addition to the open digital learning resources NDLA provides a series of net-based tools for sharing and cooperation on net. Some of these are:

- FYR Open learning resources for basic subject areas, vocational studies and relevance.
- Sharing A platform for individual sharing of material.
- NDLA Film An open film service with feature films, short films, documentaries, and TV series.
- YouTube channel providing NDLA videos.

== International Collaboration ==
NDLA cooperates with Khan Academy for translation and organising pages, Norwegian subtitles of videos, Norwegian framework and Norwegian tasks. In addition NDLA has cooperation with the PhET project at the University of Colorado, providing simulations in HTML5 as well as translation and organising of the two forms of Norwegian.

== Technology ==
NDLA was developed in the publishing system Drupal 6. The solution was initially created by the developing group Utdanning.no, but further development and operation now lies with the Cerpus group. The core code of the system is open source software; open for anyone aiming to develop digital learning resources. In 2018 NDLA relaunched on a new technological platform.

== Prizes and Nominations ==
In 2011 NDLA was nominated for European Public Service Award (EPSA). The prize is awarded annually within the EU/EEC area, the ambition is to develop and improve solutions within public and civil administration. NDLA was candidate for the prize with the entry: NDLA Innovation in Acquisition, Development and Distribution of Digital Learning Resources. A total of 274 initiatives were evaluated, and 15 candidates were shortlisted for the prize.

In 2014 NDLA won the Boldic Award for its open and innovative web repository at ndla.no. In the jury statement, it was pointed out that NDLA's project strategy and solutions can be scalable across the Nordic and Baltic countries, and that NDLA provides a unique way of working together to promote distance learning and ICT-supported flexible lifelong learning.

In 2017 NDLA won the Open Educational Resources Awards for best OER Site.

== External evaluations ==
The NDLA learning resources are continually evaluated by independent third parties. An external users' study from 2013 revealed that NDLA was mostly used as supplement to a traditional textbook, and the use was largely managed by the teacher. Students pointed out e-lectures and differentiated tasks as most useful. Both teachers and students emphasized the value of the possibility to differentiate material and tasks designed for students with varying learning capability.

== Procurement and Production ==
By publicly inviting tenders NDLA searches the market for digital learning resources to cover the competence aims of the different subject areas. NDLA asks for production services, developing groups of digital learning material, for either parts of, or prospective total solutions for a complete curriculum.

The responsibility for the editorial work, organising, meta-tagging, and putting together the material in the respective subject areas lies with competent editing groups recruited from upper secondary schools in the counties. The contents of each site are quality controlled by academy and university expertise, or otherwise specialists in that particular field. All the core material is published in the two forms of Norwegian.

When the demand is not met by the supply, the editing groups will produce their own material. The publishing companies are invited to collaborate in every round of purchase, and are free to make an offer of their material that will benefit their interests.

== Funding ==
The basic income of NDLA rests on a joint contribution from the part-taking counties, of NOK 400, – per student, which constitutes an annual income of estimated NOK 64 mill. In 2013 this figure was lower due to Akershus' leaving the project. 66% of NDLA's net expenses in 2013 were spent on purchase in the market.

In 2010 NDLA was indicted by the Norwegian Publishers' Association before the European Surveillance Authority (ESA). The publishers claimed that the state funding of more than NOK 150 mill did not comply with the international regulation of financial state support, and represented an obstacle to the establishing of a free market for digital learning resources.

The indictment was initially rejected by the EFTA Surveillance Authority on 12 October 2011, but in December 2012 the dismissal was set aside by the EFTA Court after an appeal from the Publishers' Association. In March 2013 the EFTA Court announced a formal investigation of the funding of NDLA, and ESA reopened the case. After a close examination ESA reached the same conclusion; the funding of NDLA is in compliance with the rules of state funding.
