= Peer production =

Way of producing goods and services

Peer production (also known as mass collaboration) is a way of producing goods and services that relies on self-organizing communities of individuals. In such communities, the labor of many people is coordinated towards a shared outcome.

== Overview ==
Peer production is a process taking advantage of new collaborative possibilities afforded by the internet and has become a widespread mode of labor. Free and open source software and open source hardware are two examples of peer production, but also commercial software can be manufactured in open collaboration environments. One of the earliest instances of networked peer production is Project Gutenberg, a project in which volunteers make out-of-copyright works available online. Other non-profit examples include Wikipedia, an online encyclopedia (which has been described as "one of the most classic examples" of the peer production concept), Linux, a computer operating system, and Mozilla, a browser. For-profit enterprises mostly use partial implementations of peer production, and would include such sites as Delicious, Digg, Etsy, Goodreads, Flickr, Tripadvisor or Yelp. Peer production refers to the production process on which the previous examples are based. Commons-based peer production is a subset of peer production defined by its non-profit focus.

Peer production occurs in a socio-technical system which allows thousands of individuals to effectively cooperate to create a non-exclusive given outcome. Implanting the principle of open collaboration, participants of peer production projects can join and leave at will. These collective efforts are informal and non-unionized. Peer production is a collaborative effort with no limit to the amount of discussion or changes that can be made to the product. However, as in the case of Wikipedia, a large amount, in fact the majority, of this collaborative effort is maintained by very few devoted and active individuals.

From the organizational perspective, peer production is characterized by its minimal formal hierarchies, governance and leadership; in fact some even have a strong anti-hierarchical and leaderless ethos.

== Applications ==
Peer production is also expanding beyond knowledge production, in the realm of manufacturing. For example, there are now several types of open-source solar-powered 3-D printers, which can be used for production in off grid locations and other forms of open source appropriate technology like the use of biomaterials.

Peer production has also been utilized in producing collaborative Open Educational Resources (OERs). Writing Commons, an international open textbook spearheaded by Joe Moxley at the University of South Florida, has evolved from a print textbook into a crowd-sourced resource for college writers around the world. Massive open online course (MOOC) platforms have also generated interest in building online eBooks. The Cultivating Change Community (CCMOOC) at the University of Minnesota is one such project founded entirely on a grassroots model to generate content. In 10 weeks, 150 authors contributed more than 50 chapters to the CCMOOC eBook and companion site. The Peer to Peer University has applied peer production principles to online open learning communities and peer learning.

== Criticism ==
Several critics have challenged the prevailing optimism with which peer production is viewed.

Daniel Kreiss, Megan Finn, and Fred Turner criticize the consensus perspective on peer production as utopian. Asserting that this new mode of production challenges the traditional form of bureaucracy, they reference Max Weber’s analysis of modern bureaucracy and urge that this analysis be applied to peer production. They argue that bureaucracy is better equipped to handle social problems than peer production, which they consider unsustainable. As bureaucracy promotes a rationally organized, rule-oriented functioning of society, Kreiss, Finn, and Turner claim that peer production undermines this aspect due to its tendency to encourage individual behavior based on private morality. This tendency, they argue, degrades autonomy by “collapsing public and private boundaries,” allowing people's professional lives to extend into their private domains.

Other critics claim that the participatory nature of peer production is apt to generate misinformation and products of inferior quality. In his book The Cult of the Amateur, Andrew Keen assesses peer-produced content on the Internet and asserts that it exists as a “smokescreen” which emptily promises more truth and deeper knowledge, but actually leading to the disappearance of truth. According to Keen, the Internet advocates peer production to a questionable degree by permitting anyone to post information freely. This form of peer production, he cautions, leaves room for people to plagiarize ideas and distort original thoughts, which he says ultimately creates an uncertainty in the validity of information.

Another critic, Jaron Lanier, cites Wikipedia as an example of how dependence on mass collaboration may result in unreliable or biased information. He warns that websites like Wikipedia promote the notion of the “collective” as all knowing, and that this concentrated influence stands in direct contrast to representative democracy.

In addition to these adversarial views, some critics assert that peer production does not perform as well in some contexts as it does in others. Paul Duguid suggests that peer production works less efficiently outside of software development, stating that continued reliance on peer production in various domains of information production will necessitate a search for new ways to guarantee quality. Yochai Benkler similarly proposes that peer production may produce functional works like encyclopedias more proficiently than creative works. Critics continue to doubt extensive collaboration and its ability to yield high quality outputs.

== See also ==
- Anti-rival good
- Carr-Benkler wager
- Citizen science
- Co-creation
- Cognitive Surplus – a book
- Collaboration
- Collaborative software development model
- Commons-based peer production
- Crowdsourcing software development
- Fablab
- Gamification
- Decentralized planning (economics)
- Distributed manufacturing
- Gift economy
- Knowledge commons
- Motivations of open source programmers
- Nonformal learning
- Peer review
- Polymath Project
- Production for use
- Prosumer
- Open business
- Open innovation
- Open Music Model
- Open-source-appropriate technology
- Social peer to peer processes
- Common ownership
