= WikiEducator =

Project for open education resources

- Website type: Open educational resources which anyone may use, adapt, and share
- Available in: English
- Owners: Owned by community and supported by OER Foundation
- Creator: Wayne Mackintosh
- Website: www.wikieducator.org
- Commercial: No
- Registration: Required
- Launched: 12 February 2006
- Current status: Active
- Content license: Creative Commons Attribution Share-Alike

WikiEducator is an international online community project for the collaborative development of learning materials, which educators are free to reuse, adapt and share without restriction. WikiEducator was launched in 2006 and is supported by the non-profit Open Education Resource Foundation (OER). A variety of learning resources are available on WikiEducator: direct instructional resources such as lesson plans and full courses, as well as learning-support resources, such as individual school portals and funding proposals.

WikiEducator's stated goal is to build a thriving and sustainable global community dedicated to the design, development and delivery of free content for learning in realisation of a free version of the education curriculum by 2015. The project purports to focus on building capacity in the use of MediaWiki and related free software technologies, developing free content for use in educational institutions and elsewhere, facilitating the establishment of community networks and collaboration, and fostering new technologies.

== History ==
Wayne Mackintosh created the prototype of WikiEducator on a desktop machine, making the very first edit on 13 February 2006. He registered the WikiEducator domain name on 12 February 2006 in New Zealand. In April 2006, the prototype was moved onto a hosted server with the financial assistance of Commonwealth of Learning (COL). COL provided sponsorship and leadership for the project, including receipt of a $100,000 grant from The William and Flora Hewlett Foundation to develop WikiEducator. On 1 July 2009, WikiEducator became an independent entity, headquartered at the new International Centre for Open Education at Otago Polytechnic in Dunedin, New Zealand. While COL continues to provide some financial support for WikiEducator, the Open Education Resource Foundation maintains the technical and operational infrastructure of the WikiEducator community in accordance with the policies approved by the WikiEducator Community Council.

The WikiEducator domain announced it would be shutting down.

== Participant training ==
WikiEducator's training programme is called Learning4Content (L4C). Under this initiative, the WikiEducator project arranges free face-to-face as well as online wiki skills and OER development trainings. In return for participants' pledge to develop a learning resource on the wiki, the WikiEducator community supports them in their journey to acquire wiki editing skills and to experience the peer-based model for developing OERs. The WikiEducator community will also certify new WikiEducators who request certification of their skills under the L4C initiative.

== Recognition ==
WikiEducator was the inaugural recipient of the MERLOT Africa Network's award for exemplary open educational resources (OERs) practices in 2008.

== See also ==
- Wikiversity
