= UNESCO 2012 Paris OER Declaration =

The UNESCO 2012 Paris OER Declaration, otherwise known as the Paris declaration on Open Educational Resources, is a declaration urging governments to promote the use of open educational resources (OERs) and calling for publicly funded educational materials to be released in a freely reusable form.

== Creation ==
In June 2012, the United Nations Educational, Scientific and Cultural Organisation (UNESCO) and the Commonwealth of Learning (COL) held a World OER Congress. This took place at the UNESCO headquarters in Paris with financial support from the William and Flora Hewlett Foundation. At this point, the Open Educational Resources (OER) movement was a decade old, the term having been coined in another meeting at UNESCO in 2002. The congress wrote and, on 22 June, formally adopted a ten-point declaration calling on states to realise the benefits of open education.

== Content ==
The declaration was influenced by article 26 of the United Nations Universal Declaration on Human Rights, which says that "Everyone has the right to education", and article 13.1 of the International Covenant on Economic, Social and Cultural Rights which "recognize[s] the right of everyone to education". It defines open educational resources (OER) as:

"teaching, learning and research materials in any medium, digital or otherwise, that reside in the public domain or have been released under an open license that permits no-cost access, use, adaptation and redistribution by others with no or limited restrictions."

It makes ten recommendations for governments relating to OER:

1. Foster awareness and use of OER.
2. Facilitate enabling environments for use of Information and Communications Technologies (ICT).
3. Reinforce the development of strategies and policies on OER.
4. Promote the understanding and use of open licensing frameworks.
5. Support capacity building for the sustainable development of quality learning materials.
6. Foster strategic alliances for OER.
7. Encourage the development and adaptation of OER in a variety of languages and cultural contexts.
8. Encourage research on OER.
9. Facilitate finding, retrieving and sharing of OER.
10. Encourage the open licensing of educational materials produced with public funds.

== Impact ==
In addition to the Paris declaration, UNESCO and COL have worked on regional and national projects to encourage governments around the world to adopt policies on open educational resources. A review published by UNESCO in 2015 describes the impact on government policies as "modest" while identifying some examples of success. The Paris declaration led to the 2017 Ljubljana Action Plan, and to the 2019 UNESCO OER Recommendation.

The Scottish Open Education Declaration, created in 2013 by a network of individuals from educational organisations in Scotland, is based on the Paris declaration.

== See also ==
- Cape Town Open Education Declaration
- National Repository of Open Educational Resources
