= OER Universitas =

Educational organization

Open Educational Resource (OER) Universitas is a collaboration of post-secondary educational institutions and other organisations with the aim of providing opportunities to learn from open educational resources and gain credit at costs lower than traditional degrees. The conceptual framework underpinning ENGAGEDe in free learning, and receive formal accreditation from participating universities. It is possible to use OER Universitas partners as an alternative paths to earning a degree

== Founding Anchor Partners ==
The founding anchor partners of the OER Universitas are:

- Athabasca University (Canada)
- Dr. Babasaheb Ambedkar Open University (India)
- Nelson Marlborough Institute of Technology (New Zealand)
- NorthTec (New Zealand)
- Otago Polytechnic (New Zealand)
- Southern New Hampshire University (USA)
- SUNY Empire State College US
- Thompson Rivers University (Canada)
- University of Canterbury (New Zealand)
- University of South Africa (South Africa)
- University of Southern Queensland (Australia)
- University of Wollongong (Australia)
- OER Foundation (non-teaching)
- BCcampus (Canada, non-teaching).
