= OpenLearning =

ASX-listed educational technology company based in Australia

OpenLearning Limited
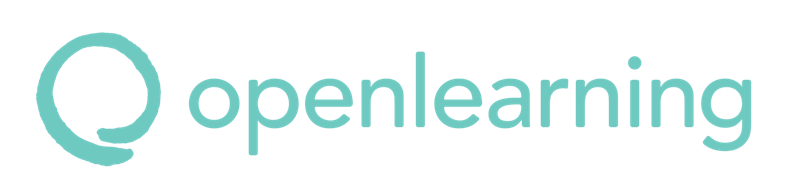
- Company type: Public
- Traded as: ASX: OLL
- Headquarters: Surry Hills, Australia
- Area served: Worldwide
- Key people: Adam Brimo; David Collien; Richard Buckland
- Industry: e-learning
- Website: openlearning.com
- Commercial: Yes
- Registration: Required
- Users: 2,170,000 (July 2020)
- Launched: 12 March 2013; 13 years ago
- Current status: Active

OpenLearning Limited (OLL) is an Australian Securities Exchange listed educational technology company based in Australia that offers a social online learning platform that can deliver massive open online courses (MOOCs), short courses, and online degrees.

== History ==
OpenLearning has worked with the University of New South Wales and Taylor's University to deliver the first MOOCs in Australia and Malaysia respectively.

In December 2013, OpenLearning launched a cloud based software product for companies to create private educational portals on its platform.

In September 2014, the Malaysian Ministry of Higher Education selected OpenLearning as the national MOOC platform for public universities. In September 2018, OpenLearning announced that it had worked with 20 public universities, 10 private universities and 34 polytechnics in Malaysia to deliver over 800 courses to 600,000 students.

In February 2015, OpenLearning raised $1.7 million in funding led by angel investor Clive Mayhew, ASX-listed ICS Global, Robin and Susan Yandle, and Hideaki Fukutake, the director of Japanese education company Benesse Holdings.

In June 2015, the Australian Federal Government announced it would be getting its first MOOC delivered by OpenLearning.

By late 2019, OpenLearning began providing its platform to universities and colleges on a software-as-a-service model and announced that it had established partnerships University of New South Wales, the University of Melbourne, Charles Sturt University, University of Technology Sydney, the University of New England, the University of Newcastle and Macquarie University.

In October 2019, OpenLearning announced its intention to pursue a listing on the Australian Securities Exchange.
