= Language Experience Approach =

The Language Experience Approach (LEA) is a method for teaching literacy based on a child's existing experience of language.

Some of the components of the LEA were used in the 1920s, and this approach to initial literacy has been more widely used for the past thirty years. Especially in the context of open learning, teachers use the students' existing language and prior experiences to develop reading, writing and listening skills.

Roach Van Allen, first described his approach in the 1960s; he indicated how this strategy could create a natural bridge between spoken language and written language by stating:

What I can say, I can write

What I can write, I can read

I can read what I write and what other people can write for me to read.

== Examples ==
The language experience approach can be traced back to the work of Ashton-Warner (1963) and Paulo Freire (1972) with underprivileged children and adults. It now is in use in many countries in the context of open learning. More recent conceptions (cf. for overviews: Allen 1976; Dorr 2006) have been developed in the U.S., especially by Richgels (2001) and McGee/Richgels (2011), and in Germany by Brügelmann (1986) and Brügelmann/Brinkmann (2013) stimulating invented spelling as a means of self-expression in print ("writing to reading").

It is often suggested that the teacher should provide some type of common experience that will inspire students to express their thoughts utilizing any prior experience they might have had relating to the particular topic of choice. Examples of these experiences could include a trip to the beach, planting seeds, the necessity to prepare for a class party or even a visit to the dentist or doctor. One of the main functions of teachers is to motivate and inspire their students.

The language experience strategy can be used to teach reading and comprehension to older ESOL struggling readers, and students with special needs. LEA can be used with a small group of students or individual students. It is important that when using this strategy, the teacher records exactly what the student contributes without correcting grammar; however, the spelling should be correct and not written in the student's dialect.

The student dictates to the teacher his/her understanding of a particular topic selected by the teacher. The teacher then records the student's narration exactly as the student dictates it; after the teacher records the student's contribution, the teacher then reads it orally in its entirety.
