= FarmBot =

Open-source precision agriculture CNC farming project

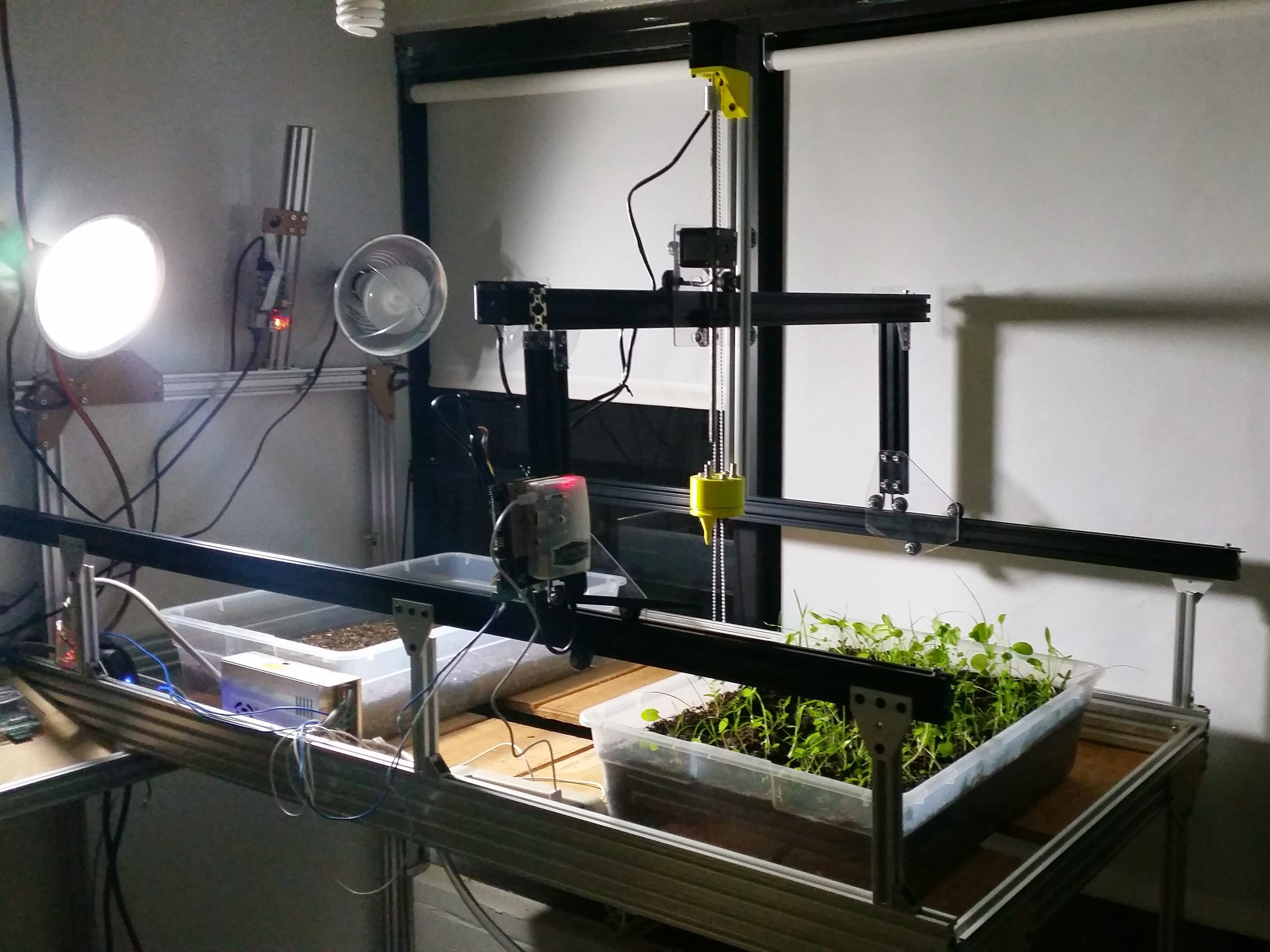
- FarmBot Genesis working indoors
- Classification: Open source farming project
- Inventor: Rory Aronson, Rick Carlino, Tim Evers
- Manufacturer: FarmBot.io

FarmBot is an open source precision agriculture CNC farming project consisting of a Cartesian coordinate robot farming machine, software and documentation including a farming data repository. The project aims to "Create an open and accessible technology aiding everyone to grow food and to grow food for everyone."

== History ==
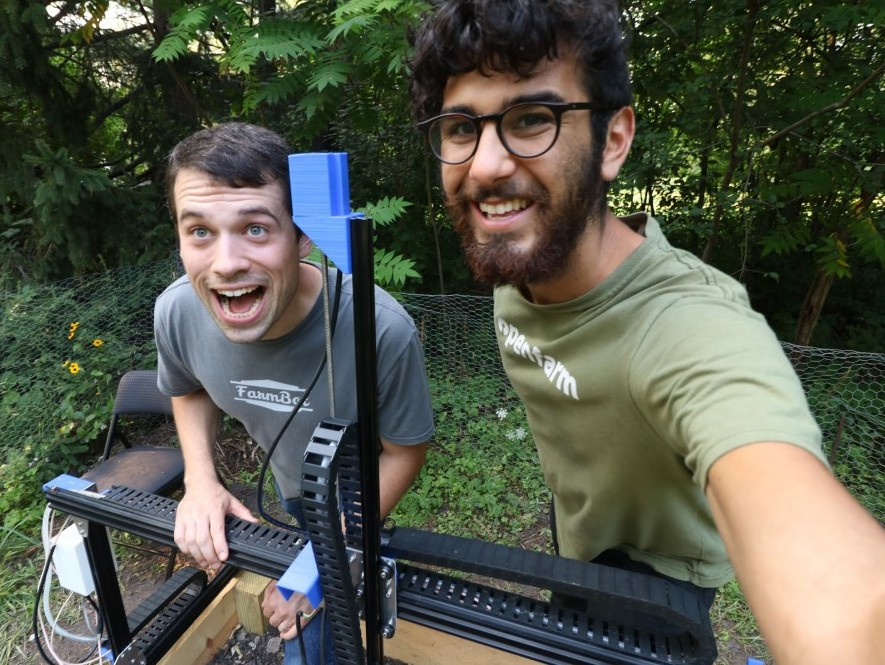
FarmBot creators Rick Carlino (left) and Rory Aronson (right) building a FarmBot in Chicago, Illinois

The FarmBot project was started in 2011 by American Rory Aronson whilst studying mechanical engineering at California Polytechnic State University. Aronson attended an elective course in organic agriculture where he learned about a tractor that used machine vision to detect and cover weeds which removed the need for herbicides or manual labour, the tractor cost over US$1 million.

In March 2014 Aronson began working on the project full-time funded by a grant from the Shuttleworth Foundation. Firmware developer Tim Evers and software developer Rick Carlino later joined the project as core developers. Rory Aronson created the company Farmbot.io to provide hardware kits and software services and to serve as a funding source to maintain the open source community.

In 2014 and 2015, FarmBot was entered into the Hackaday Prize, where it became a finalist in 2015. After nine design iterations, the FarmBot Genesis began preorders in July 2016 as the first commercially available version of FarmBot.

== Farmbot Genesis ==
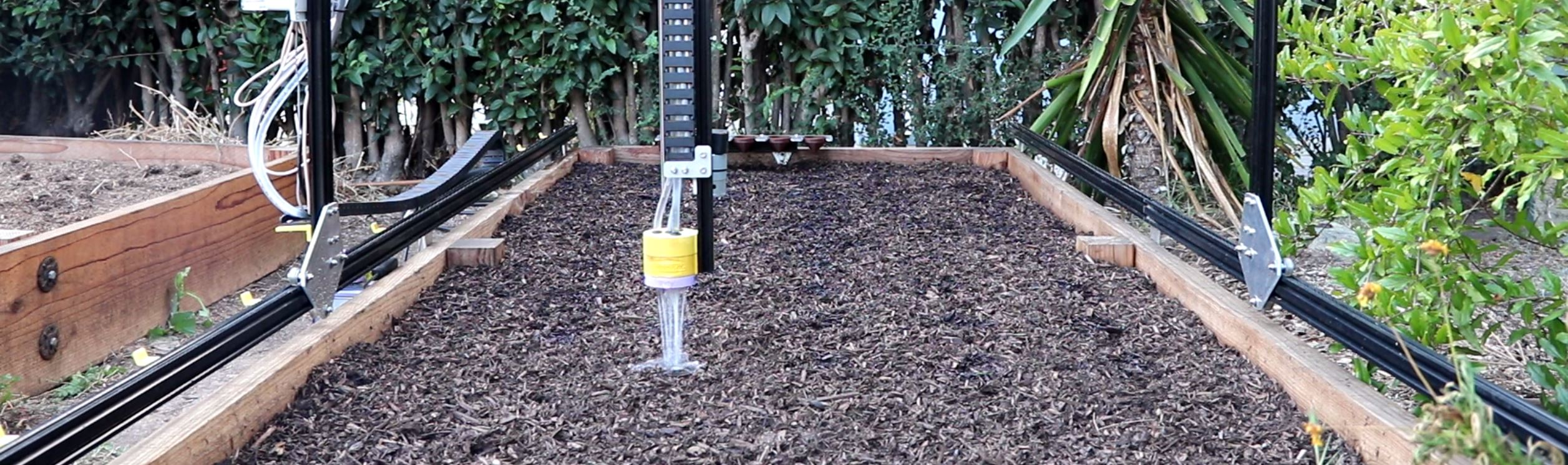
FarmBot prototype watering for the first time.

=== Capabilities ===
The FarmBot Genesis is able to plant over 30 different crops within the same area at the same time and is able to operate indoors, outdoors and in covered areas. It can perform almost all processes prior to harvesting including sowing, mechanical weed control and watering while accounting for factors such as age of the plant and local weather conditions.

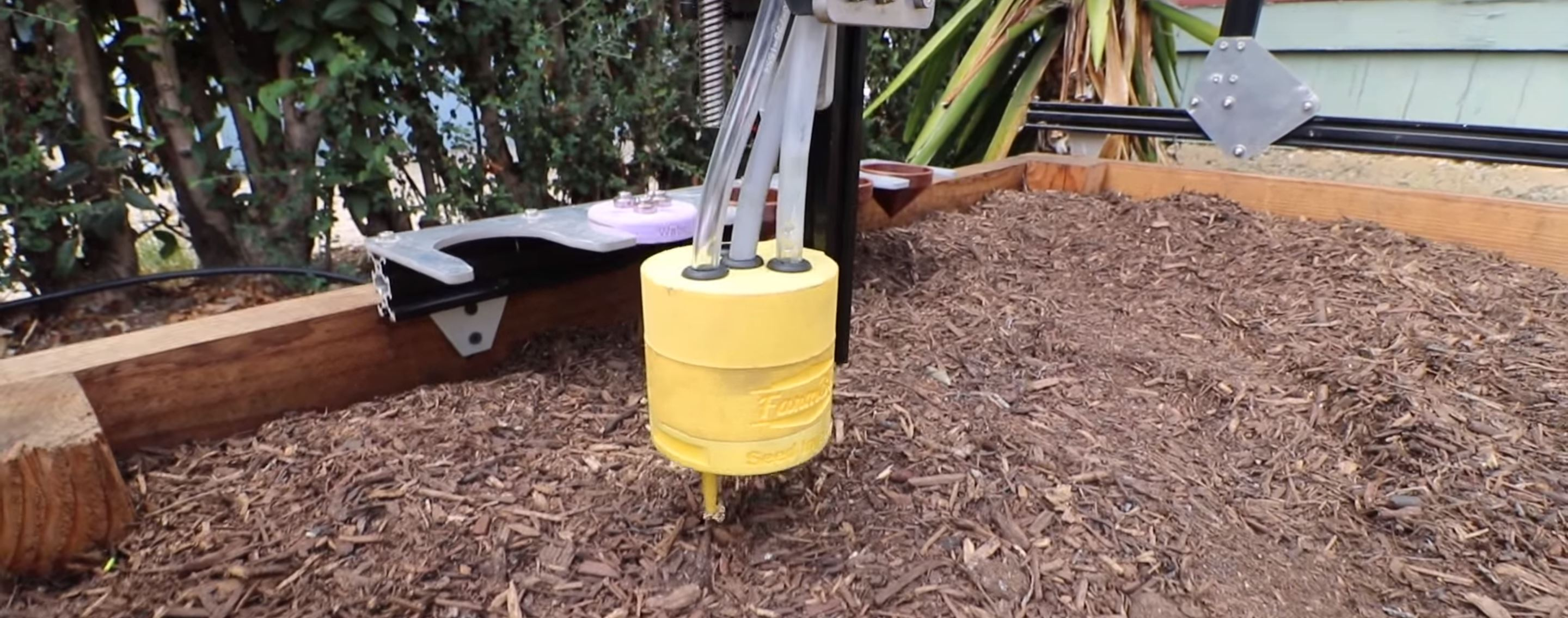
FarmBot prototype planting seeds for the first time.

FarmBot Genesis is controlled through a web based interface allowing remote access from any location on most internet enabled devices. It uses an online crop database called OpenFarm to create an optimal planting plan based on the size of the adult crop.

=== Components ===
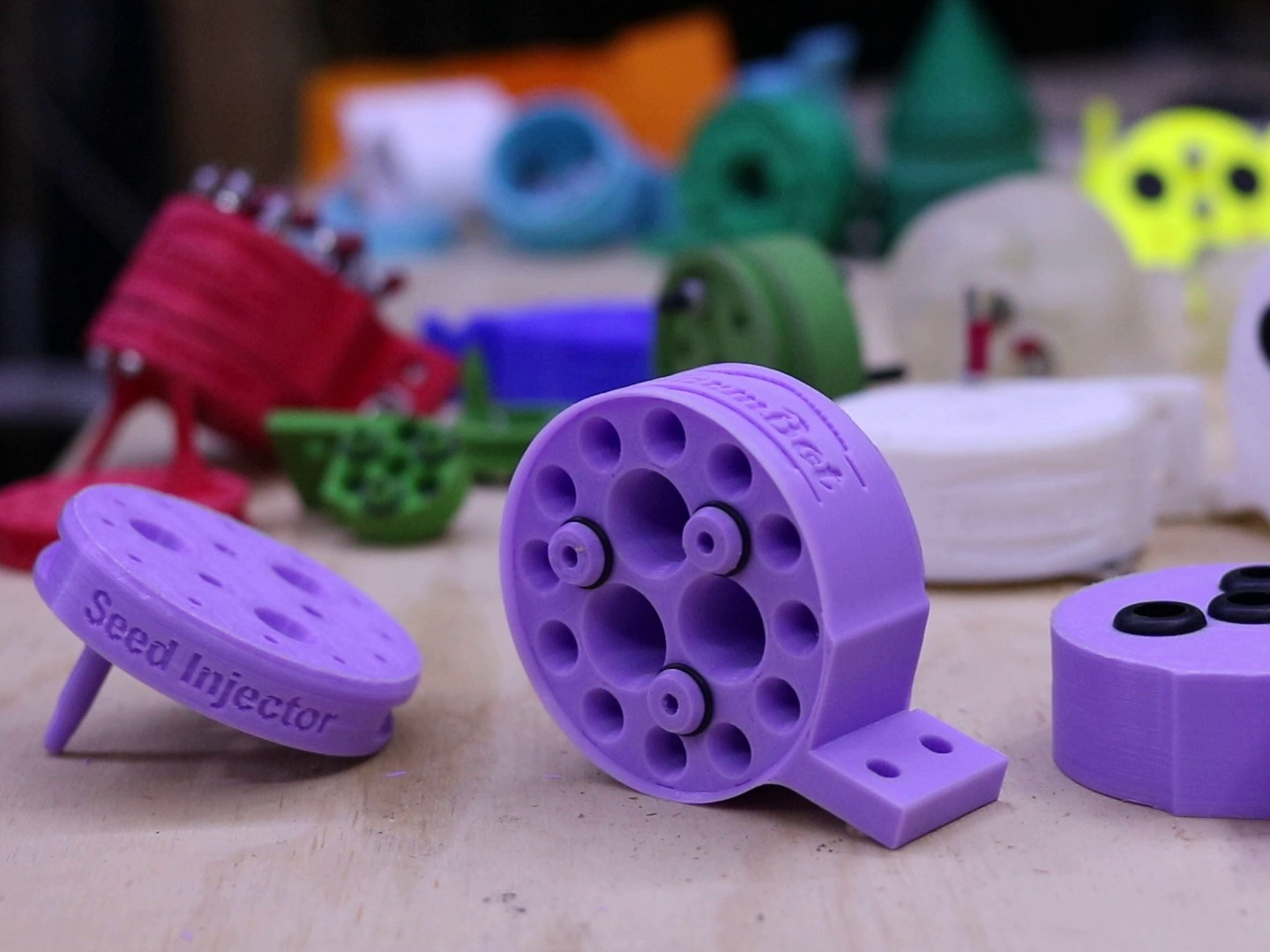
All of FarmBot's plastic components are designed to be 3D printed with hobby level FDM printers

The Farmbot Genesis is an open source hardware machine and is designed around reproduce-ability and availability of components, it can be created using common tools and processes. Its electronics stack consists of a Raspberry Pi 3 and Arduino Mega 2560 with a RAMPS 1.4 shield and a camera to record data. The universal tool mount and other tools are 3D printed and are designed to be created with hobby level fused deposition model 3D printers e.g. a RepRap printer. It has two electrical connections and connectors for liquid or gas which are magnetically coupled.

The software for the FarmBot Genesis runs through a web interface allowing the machine to be controlled on most internet enabled devices. All software is available under the MIT license and is available on GitHub.

== See also ==
- Open Source Ecology
- RepRap project
