= Falko Peschel =

German pedagogue (born 1965)

Falko Peschel (born January 20, 1965) is a German pedagogue and proponent of open learning. He has gained attention for his unorthodox educational experiments and publications.
