= European Schoolnet =

European Schoolnet or EUN is a network of 34 European Ministries of Education, based in Brussels. As a not-for-profit organisation, it aims to bring innovation in teaching and learning to its key stakeholders: Ministries of Education, schools, teachers, researchers, and industry partners.

Since its founding in 1997 with development funded initially through the EU Multimedia 1010 initiative (Holmes, 2013a, b; Leask and Younie, 2001; Simeca et al., 2009) and later through ministry support, European Schoolnet has helped schools make effective use of educational technologies, equipping both teachers and pupils with the skills to achieve in the knowledge society. European Schoolnet provides both Ministries and schools with: information and services relating to the innovative use of educational technology, outreach campaigns on specific educational topics such as maths, science and technology; and research activities.

European Schoolnet pledges to:

- Support schools in achieving effective use of ICT in teaching and learning
- Improve and raise the quality of education in Europe
- Promote the European dimension in education

European Schoolnet involves thousands of schools in various pilot projects and studies, testing new learning activities and technologies in the classroom, and exploring the use of new pedagogical tools in teaching STEM (science, technology, engineering and maths). European Schoolnet identifies and develops learning resources in various languages that teachers across Europe can use in their teaching, provides peer-to-peer online communities where teachers can exchange ideas and share resources, as well as offers various training opportunities online and offline.

European Schoolnet runs European-funded projects with the European Commission, Ministries of Education and industry partners. These projects include iTEC (Designing the Future Classroom) and inGenious (attracting pupils towards science, technology, engineering and maths). A number of services are also coordinated for teachers and policymakers, such as Scientix, to promote science education, the Learning Resource Exchange, an online catalog of more than 200,000 OERs and Insafe, dedicated to digital citizenship skills and online safety.

European Schoolnet has worked towards enhancing cooperation across Europe between schools as the coordinator of the eTwinning Central Support Service since 2004. And it has also contributed to awareness-raising campaigns across Europe on the importance of gaining e-Skills (e-Skills Week), and transforming STEM education to increase the appeal of those sectors among pupils (ECB-Ingenious project). The E-Twinning initiative provides a private environment connecting schools and teachers across and beyond Europe.

In 2012, European Schoolnet created the Future Classroom Lab in Brussels. A unique hub for showcasing technological and pedagogical innovation, the Future Classroom Lab is supported by sponsors such as Microsoft, Samsung, Acer, Cisco, Lego and many others. Projects dedicated to teachers' professional development are being run on a continual basis, using the Future Classroom Lab to identify, analyse, and mainstream the best innovative practices in education, and equipping teachers with the necessary skills to develop their teaching practice.

In December 2013, European Schoolnet launched the European Schoolnet Academy to build on its successful experiences and make its training opportunities available to a greater number of primary and secondary school teachers across Europe. The Academy is a platform where primary and secondary school teachers can learn about innovation in the school and classroom through free online professional development courses.
