= Open Course Library =

Library of free digital learning materials

Open Course Library (OCL) is an effort by the State of Washington to identify and make available digitally, to community and technical college instructors and students across that state, free textbooks, interactive assignments, and videos. Instructional materials can be "a smorgasbord of teaching modules and exercises developed by other open-learning projects. . . Interactive-learning Web sites and even instructional videos on YouTube . . ." However, OCL is not an OER publishing project, although it did contribute to the development of some widely used resources. Goals include: lowering textbook costs for students, providing new resources for faculty to use in their courses; and fully engaging in the global OER or open educational resources discussion.

The project was funded by matching grants of $750,000 from the Bill & Melinda Gates Foundation and the Washington State legislature. In 2009–2010 the affected Washington State student body totaled 470,000 and was increasing. Many of the materials made available are open educational resources or OERs. Specifically, they include syllabi, course activities, readings, and assessments and some are paired with low cost textbooks, costing $30 or less. In subjects across the sciences and humanities, the OCL team created curriculum support for Washington State's most popular 81 courses in the state's 34 community and technical colleges. Instructors were free to use the materials as they wish, in part or an entire course. The project was headed by Cable Green, then eLearning Director for the Washington State Board for Community and Technical Colleges.

It emerged from a two-year discussion that ultimately produced a Strategic Technology Plan. The plan outlines a unified vision known as Washington Student Completion Initiative.

== Process and organizational structure ==
OCL participants were selected from a grant proposal competition. The process, which led to production of the materials, was open and several preliminary Town Meetings were used employing Eluminate Live. All participants were welcome. The meetings are archived. Topics for discussion included interactions with publishers, content presentation, copyright policies, and various Creative Commons licenses.

Successful applicants received $15,000 to complete a course redesign. Librarians, instructional designers and institutional researchers were also asked to apply. Like faculty, these successful applicants also received grants of $15,000. Each winning faculty member or team designed a ready-to-use digital course module. Teams were composed of community college instructors, librarians, and web-designers. In fall 2011 the first 42 courses created were released. The use of OCL materials is not mandated for Washington's community colleges and technical schools. Faculty course designers, however, are asked to adopt what they have designed. There were over 25,000 visits from 125 countries over the first four months. Nonetheless, there have been challenges: good material is not always available online for adoption and sometimes the best materials (for instance translations of primary sources published in foreign languages) are not available free.

== Resource availability ==
Courses are made accessible using the WashingtonOnline learning system. Externally, OCL partners with the Saylor Foundation, the Connexions Consortium, and the Open Courseware Consortium. The Saylor site can be used access course content by self-learners.

== Open Course Library and Open Educational Resources ==
A goal of the project requires instructors to become aware of the open educational resources (OERs) that are already available. A complementary goal is to share their content and adaptation by contributing to a global effort. Both directly and indirectly, Cable Green, the project's then director, observed that it has resulted in the building of networks with like-minded individuals and institutions irrespective of geography. An interest was also expressed in gauging use of materials and modules for the tenure and advancement of participants.

== Reasons for the effort ==
A 2009 New York Times article reported that college students spend between $700 and $1,000 annually on textbooks. Full-time tuition in the Washington system is approximately $3,000 annually, with textbooks costing approximately $1,000 annually. Community college tuition is lower than at most traditional four-year institutions, and, therefore, textbook costs may be proportionally higher. Any number of digital copies of a free textbook can be made for the price of one. Print-on demand copies generally cost under $10. Representative Reuven Carlyle (D-Seattle, Washington House of Representatives) estimates that because of OCL community college students saved over $1.25 million in textbook costs during the 2011–2012 school year. OCL seeks to contribute to the creation of better courses and to reduce costs for students. In this way it seeks to respond positively to the "completion" concerns outlined in the state's tipping point research report of 2008. On 17 June 2010 the Washington State Board for Community & Technical Colleges (SBCTC) approved a state-level open licensing policy. All digital works created using grant funds administered by SBCTC must now carry a Creative Commons Attribution-only (CC BY) license. This license allows materials created by one institution to be updated by another. It was within this context that OCL was launched in 2010. Nicole Allen, a textbook advocate for the national Student Public Interest Research Group (PIRG) commended the state for putting its money where its mouth is.

== Effectiveness assessment ==
The results are reported in Affordable Textbooks for Washington Students: An Updated Cost Analysis of the Open Course Library (2013), an update of Affordable Textbooks for Washington's Students: A Cost Analysis of the Open Course Library (2011). The latter reported on the first phase of courses in October 2011. In April 2013 the State Board announced the completion of all 81 courses and the updated report was released. The report concluded:

- OCL has saved students $5,500,000 since inception.
- OCL materials cost 90% less than previously used materials. The average OCL material costs $12, replacing the average priced $135 traditional item.
- Students taking OCL courses save on average $96 per course.
- Student savings are more than three times the original $1,800,000 invested.
- Two examples: By switching over to OCL material two community colleges have saved students $197,395 and $162,848 respectively.
- Future Savings: A 2011 analysis projects savings as much as $41.6 if materials are adopted by all 410,000 enrolled students.

On the other hand, in January 2014 The Chronicle of Higher Education reported that the effort to make free or low cost materials available in 42 courses was making little progress. Based on a survey of community-college stores, with responses from 25 campuses, only nine said that any materials had been used in 17 of the 42 courses. Only 2,386 of the 98,130 students enrolled in these courses, in 75 of the eligible 2,722 sections, used the materials. In 16 of the 75 sections students paid nothing; in the other 59 sections the average cost was $25. These numbers reported the work of OnCampus Research, an arm of the National Association of College Stores, which in fall 2013 sent a survey to 34 campus stores in the Washington Community and Technical College system. The survey focused on the first 42, or phase one, courses. It showed, according to the director of OnCampus Research, "that the recommendation of specific free or lower-priced course materials for popular courses did not equate to significant use of these materials by faculty." However, Marty Brown, executive director of the Washington State Board of Community and Technical Colleges, took exception in a Chronicle of Higher Education piece he explained: "The study analyzes the use of OCL materials based on adoption information from campus bookstores. This methodology provides an incomplete picture, as bookstores are not always aware when faculty members assign free, digital resources. Therefore, the study's findings do not justify its conclusion that OCL has resulted in "insignificant" savings to students. The Student PIRGs estimates the OCL has saved students more than $5.5-million, more than triple the original investment. We believe this is very significant." SPARC referred to the same presumed misunderstanding.

One reviewer states that OCL is best at "presenting introductory college course material in a condensed, simple manner via Google docs or presentations." It is noted, however, that the materials are not highly refined. Further observing that "there's something to be said about grabbing an algebra quiz or those French vocabulary words quickly." A doctoral dissertation focused specifically on the project concludes in its abstract: ". . . that while faculty may be motivated to adopt new innovations like OER, for some, the time it takes to identify and integrate OER into courses presents a significant barrier to adoption."

== Long-term impact ==
Washington State communities have integrated OCL into educational efforts in innovative ways. For instance, Bellevue College, Washington, the state's largest community college, with help with a grant from the U.S. Department of Education, purchased 500 inexpensive netbook laptop computers in November 2011 for its students to rent for $35 per quarter to "download and read Internet material." The anticipation was that the machines would also be used with OCL material. Since its initiation, OCL is credited with inspiring open textbook initiatives by the legislatures of California (2012), British Columbia (2012) and actions by the legislatures of Illinois, Minnesota, and Virginia all similar to California's. North Dakota proposed a resolution asking faculty and college administrations to support the use of open textbooks. Further, the Trade Adjustment Community College and Career Training grants program requires that all material created using federal funds be available to the public through an open license. Materials produced through this vehicle will be added to the OCL.

The Saylor Foundation will create modular versions of the courses. Project Kaleidoscope intends to modify OCL materials to meet the needs of California's community college students. The department of education in São Paulo Brazil plans Portuguese translations of the courses.

== See also ==
- Free textbook
- Open Educational Resources
- Open source curriculum
- OpenCourseWare
- Open textbook
