= Hans Brügelmann =

German academic

Hans Brügelmann (born 1946) is a German teacher and educational researcher. He was professor of pedagogy.

From 1971 until 1973, he has been assistant to the committee "strategies for curriculum reform" at the commission "Deutscher Bildungsrat," a commission for educational planning of the German federal and state governments. Before and after his conferral of a doctorate in 1975, he worked on several evaluation projects from preschool to college. In 1980, he was appointed to a professorship at the University of Bremen; in 1993, he was appointed professor for primary school pedagogics and didactics at the University of Siegen.

He was retired in 2012.
