= Writing Commons =

Peer-reviewed open education resource

Writing Commons (WC) is a peer-reviewed open education resource (OER) for college-level writers. Founded in 2008 by Joseph M. Moxley, a professor of English and the director of the first-year writing program at the University of South Florida, Writing Commons was developed from a highly regarded text into one of the most heavily used open textbooks on the web. Following a crowdsourcing process, Writing Commons now offers an interactive and comprehensive introduction to college-level writing. In 2012, Writing Commons was viewed by over 145,000 unique users for a total of 167,000 users. Writing Commons was developed from College Writing Online (Longman/Pearson, 2003) a first-year composition textbook written by Joseph Moxley. Awarded the Distinguished Book Award by Computers and Composition: an International Journal in 2003, College Writing Online has since been republished as Writing Commons in an open textbook format. Writing Commons accepts submissions through a strenuous peer-review process. The editorial board consists of distinguished educators and academics from across the globe. Writing Commons publishes webtexts under a Creative Commons 3.0 NC ND License.

Writing Commons is currently used as a supplemented text in the first-year writing program at the University of South Florida. The first-year composition program at the University of South Florida, utilizing Writing Commons as a text, was awarded the 2012 Writing Program Certificate of Excellence by the National Council of Teachers of English and the Conference on College Composition. Writing Commons offers (Open) Text, an area devoted to various aspects of writing in college and especially writing on the Web. Common Comments, another partnership with the first-year writing program at the University of South Florida, provides an enhanced peer review commenting platform. The site also supports Common Space, an open area for users to generate blog posts, provide comments, and ask questions.
