= MERLOT =

Online repository and international consortium of institutions

- Multimedia Education Resource for Learning and Online Teaching
- Formation: 1997; 29 years ago
- Founder: Chuck Schneebeck
- Services: Open Educational Resources, E-learning, education
- Executive Director: Gerry Hanley
- Affiliations: California State University Center for Distributed Learning
- Website: merlot.org

MERLOT (Multimedia Education Resource for Learning and Online Teaching) is an online repository and international consortium of institutions (and systems) of higher education, industry partners, professional organizations, and individuals. MERLOT partners and members are devoted to identifying, peer reviewing, organizing, and making available existing online learning resources in a range of academic disciplines for use by higher education faculty and students.

MERLOT consists of a community of staff (at The California State University, Office of the Chancellor), volunteers, and members who work together in various ways to provide users of OER (Open Educational Resources) teaching and learning materials with a wealth of services and functions that can enhance their instructional experience.

== History ==
The MERLOT project began in 1997, when the California State University Center for Distributed Learning (CSU-CDL) developed MERLOT. Under the leadership of Chuck Schneebeck, CSU-CDL's Director at the time, MERLOT was modeled after the NSF funded project, "Authoring Tools and An Educational Object Economy (EOE)". Led by Dr. James Spohre and hosted by Apple Computer, and other industry, university, and government collaborators, the EOE developed and distributed tools to enable the formation of communities engaged in building shared knowledge bases of learning materials.

In 1998, a State Higher Education Executives Organization/American Productivity and Quality Center (SHEEO/APQC) benchmarking study on faculty development and instructional technology selected the CSU-CDL as one of six best practices centers in North America. Visitations to the CSU-CDL by higher education institutions participating in the benchmarking students resulted in interest in collaborating with the CSU on the MERLOT project. The University of Georgia System, Oklahoma State Regents for Higher Education, University of North Carolina System, and the California State University System created an informal consortium representing almost one hundred campuses serving over 900,000 students and over 47,000 faculty. SHEEO was the coordinator for the cooperative of the four state systems.

In 1999, the four systems recognized the significant benefits of a cooperative initiative to expand the MERLOT collections, conduct peer reviews of the digital learning materials, and add student learning assignments. Each system contributed $20,000 in cash to develop the MERLOT software and over $30,000 in in-kind support to advance the collaborative project. The CSU maintained its leadership and responsibilities for the operation and improvement of processes and tools. In January, 2000, the four systems sponsored 48 faculty from the disciplines of Biology, Physics, Business and Teacher Education (12 faculty from each of the four systems) to develop evaluation standards and peer review processes for online materials in the MERLOT collection.

In April 2000, other systems and institutions of higher education were invited to join the MERLOT cooperative. In July 2000, twenty-three (23) systems and institutions of higher education had become Institutional Partners of MERLOT. Each Institutional Partner contributed $25,000 and in-kind support for eight faculty and a project director (part-time) to coordinate MERLOT activities. The CSU continued its leadership of and responsibilities for the operation and improvement of processes and tools.

In 2009, MERLOT took over the Carnegie Foundation for the Advancement of Teaching's KEEP Toolkit and it became the MERLOT Content Builder. At that time, any KEEP Toolkit user who wished to maintain their web pages could become a MERLOT member and automatically have their projects migrated and hosted by MERLOT.

== Professional Involvement ==
MERLOT has been particularly influential in the development of online education and has been successful in, "developing a professional evaluation model to promote scholarship in teaching in the universities." MERLOT hosts one of the world's largest collections of Open textbooks through the Open Textbook Project in collaboration with student-run Public Interest Research Groups. In addition, MERLOT has been cited as one of the most effective electronic portals for health care information.

MERLOT has been influential as a model in the development of other online communities and resource repositories, including innovative collaborations with IBM and the National Learning Infrastructure Initiative (an Educause program), and as an important tool for educational reform (especially in STEM fields). MERLOT has itself become the subject of much research.

== MERLOT Volunteer Staff ==
Community Members help grow the MERLOT collection by contributing materials and adding assignments and comments. Additionally, they introduce others in the discipline to MERLOT by presenting at conferences, authoring articles about MERLOT, and encouraging others to use and contribute to MERLOT.

Volunteer community Members work with MERLOT staff to develop policies and practices that govern MERLOT's operations. These volunteers are member of Editorial Boards and Project Directors.

=== Editorial Boards ===
There is one Editorial Board for each community, composed of an Editor, Associate Editors and Peer Reviewers.

Editors, Associate Editors, and peer reviewers are nominated by System Partners, Campus Partners, and the MERLOT Management Team.

Each editorial board is responsible for:

- Expanding and managing the collection of online learning materials in its discipline,
- Educating and reaching out to the community of educators in its discipline,
- Implementing and managing the MERLOT peer review process for materials in its discipline,
- Recruiting and training peer reviewers.

=== Project Directors ===
The MERLOT Leadership Council is composed of all the Project Directors from System and Campus Partners, along with Editors from each of the MERLOT Discipline Communities. Project Directors have critical responsibilities in managing their institution's participation in MERLOT and MERLOT's connection to their institution's academic technology initiatives. Responsibilities of Project Directors include participation in MERLOT's governance activities, selection of Editors and editorial board members, supervision of editorial board members, and management of their institutions' partnership with MERLOT. MERLOT provides Project Directors with online tools and analytics to assist them in monitoring their members' participation in MERLOT.
