= OpenLearn =

Open University's OpenCourseWare website

- Type: Public
- Established: 2006
- Founders: Harold Wilson; Jennie Lee; Walter Perry; Peter Venables
- Chancellor: Baroness Lane-Fox of Soho
- Vice-Chancellor: Professor David Phoenix
- Location: Milton Keynes (main campus), United Kingdom; 48 hectares (0.48 km^{2})
Colours
- Website: www.open.edu/openlearn

OpenLearn is the Open University's free learning platform, and contribution to open educational resources (OER). Created in 2006, it was originally part-funded by the William and Flora Hewlett Foundation. OpenLearn is a member of the OpenCourseWare Consortium (OCWC).

== History ==
OpenLearn dates back to 1999, when Open2.net, an Open University-BBC collaboration, gave a first home to free learning resources that the public could interact with without the need to sign up to study a university course. The Open University launched the OpenLearn brand with the LearningSpace website in October 2006 to provide free access to extracts of educational materials generated as part of course production. The publication of such structured learning materials, designed for distance education, is unique in the field of open educational resources.

LearningSpace and Open2.net came together under the same OpenLearn brand in 2010, creating a single home for all free learning from The Open University. It also aggregates videos and audio made available via other Open University channels, such as iTunesU, YouTube, and AudioBoo. Since 2014, it has also been republishing The Open University's courses from FutureLearn, providing a space where learners unwilling or unable to commit to FutureLearn's weekly learning model can follow courses to their own timetable.

== Fundamentals of the program ==
Through the Moodle-based virtual learning environment, learners are offered over 1000 structured media-rich study units, supported by a number of learning and communication tools in the Free Courses area. Personal profiles, learning journals and rating options empower learners to become self publishers and reviewers, tagging their entries to provide a means by which others can find and connect with their ideas. Knowledge mapping software enables learners to visually represent resources and the links between them, to construct arguments and frame debates.

The OpenLearn website also provides a standalone experience for the learner, but is also one that can be taken apart and remixed to take on a new form. The Web 2.0 approach to an open and collaborative LearningSpace primarily for learners, is complemented by OpenLearn Create(formerly Labspace and OpenLearnWorks), an area for experimentation, where educational practitioners are encouraged to download, amend and adapt both current and archived course materials. Published under an Attribution-ShareAlike-NonCommercial Creative Commons license, the Open University media-rich materials can be reused in alternative educational settings, repurposed for a local context, translated and built upon to form a larger open repository of derivative educational materials. Collaborators are encouraged to form their own areas within the LabSpace to personalise the materials, increasing the relevance of the content for specific learning communities and to test out course ideas and develop materials based on user feedback.

== Virtual content ==
OpenLearn enables virtual content not just through its licensing model, but also through a commitment to open technologies. The use of an open source virtual learning environment, along with the ability for people to download and upload materials in various formats (from an RSS to a print to an IMS Common Cartridge) encourages replication of the content and enables interoperability with other provider's content management systems. Innovators have already re-published OpenLearn materials in new environments by implementing a variety of freely available technologies. The materials have been replicated in offline desktop libraries to provide access for remote communities around the world. RSS feeds enable the content to be easily embedded in web based widgets and RSS readers, allowing the engagement with the content to happen away from OpenLearn.
