= TAACCCT =

Trade Adjustment Assistance Community College and Career Training (TAACCCT) is a U.S. Department of Labor grant program for community colleges in the United States.

TAACCCT grants are designed to help workers eligible for training under the Trade Adjustment Assistance (TAA) for Workers program, as well as other adults. Every U.S. state received funding for each of four years through 256 grants totaling $1.9 billion. TAACCCT grants, which continued through September 2018, are impacting 60% of the nation's publicly funded community colleges and building industry-aligned programs in manufacturing, healthcare, information technology, energy, transportation and other industries.

Through TAACCCT, community colleges have developed or redesigned nearly 2,600 Programs of Study to help adults learn skills to lead to employment. Each college or consortium of colleges developed programs of study aligned with local and regional business needs, which were identified through partnerships formed or strengthened with grant funds.

To help adult students obtain industry-recognized credentials more quickly, colleges are using TAACCCT funding to provide career pathways, credit for prior learning, competency-based models, online training, and student support systems. The curriculum and other learning materials developed by TAACCCT grantees are available to all types of training providers on SkillsCommons.org, as described in a recent ETA Training and Employment Notice.

The Department of Labor aims to strengthen institutions of higher education so they can provide greater economic opportunity by acquiring the skills, degrees, and credentials needed for high-wage, high-skill employment. The department is implementing the TAACCCT program in partnership with the U.S. Department of Education.

== Sources ==
This article incorporates public domain material from Trade Adjusment Assistance Community College and Career Training. U.S. Department of Labor.
