= Open learning =

Innovative movement in education

Open learning is a movement in education that emerged in the 1970s and evolved into fields of practice and study. The term refers generally to activities that either enhance learning opportunities within formal education systems or broaden learning opportunities beyond formal education systems. Open learning involves but is not limited to: classroom teaching methods, approaches to interactive learning, formats in work-related education and training, the cultures and ecologies of learning communities, and the development and use of open educational resources. While there is no agreed-upon, comprehensive definition of open learning, central focus is commonly placed on the "needs of the learner as perceived by the learner." Case studies illustrate open learning as an innovation both within and across academic disciplines, professions, social sectors and national boundaries, and in business and industry, higher education institutions, collaborative initiatives between institutions, and schooling for young learners.

== Inception ==
Open learning as a teaching method is founded on the work of Célestin Freinet in France and Maria Montessori in Italy, among others. Open learning is supposed to allow pupils self-determined, independent and interest-guided learning. A prominent example is the language experience approach to teaching initial literacy (cf. Brügelmann/ Brinkmann 2011). More recent work on open learning has been conducted by the German pedagogues Hans Brügelmann (1975; 1999), Falko Peschel (2002), Jörg Ramseger (1977) and Wulf Wallrabenstein (1991). The approach is supposed to face up to three challenges (cf. in more detail Brügelmann/ Brinkmann 2008, chap. 1):

- the vast differences in experiences, interests, and competencies between children of the same age;
- the constructivist nature of learning demanding active problem-solving by the learner him- and herself;
- the legal requirement of student participation in decisions stipulated by the UN Convention on the Rights of the Child (CRC). of 1989.

== Current uses of the term ==
The term "open learning" also refers to open and free sharing of educational materials.

“Open Learning Initiative” has been used by Carnegie Mellon which is analogous to the Open Source Initiative.

== See also ==
- Active learning
- Alternative education
- Augmented learning
- Cooperative learning
- Didactic method
- Distance education
- Experiential education
- Example choice
- Language Experience Approach
- Learning by teaching (LdL)
- Language exchange
- Lifelong learning
- MIT OpenCourseWare
- MIT Open Learning
- Open education
- OpenLearning a social online learning platform for teachers to deliver courses.
- Open Learning for Development an Open Training Platform sponsored by UNESCO offering free training resources on a wide range of development topics, fostering cooperation to provide free and open content for development.
- Minimally invasive education, a term used in the deployment of Internet-connected computers in public places to encourage voluntary learning.
- Self-regulated learning
- Social learning (social pedagogy)
