= Shuttleworth Foundation =

South African organization promoting social change

- Founded: 2001
- Founder: Mark Shuttleworth
- Purpose: Open source, open content, open educational resources
- Location: Durbanville, South Africa
- Region served: Global
- Method: Fellowships
- Key people: Mark Shuttleworth, founder Helen Turvey, CEO
- Website: https://shuttleworthfoundation.com/

The Shuttleworth Foundation was established in January 2001 by South African entrepreneur Mark Shuttleworth as an experiment with the purpose of providing funding for people engaged in social change. While there have been various iterations of the foundation, its structure and how it invests in social innovation, the current model employs a fellowship model where fellows are given funding commensurate with their experience to match a year's salary, allowing them to spend that year developing a particular idea. The Foundation announced that it is shutting itself down "by the beginning of 2024."

Notable past and present fellows include Marcin Jakubowski (who develops the Open Source Ecology project), Rufus Pollock (co-founder of the Open Knowledge Foundation) and Mark Surman (now executive director of Mozilla Foundation.)

== Funding model ==
The Foundation provides funding for people who have an unproven idea in the form of a 'salary', travel and office expenses. For every dollar invested by the Fellow in a project, the Foundation will put in ten or more, allowing the Fellow to own all Intellectual Property and processes once the active fellowship has ceased.

== Projects ==
- Freedom Toaster
- Kusasa
- SchoolTool, student information system
- Serval Project, for smart phone ad hoc networks
- strong encryption for Twitter
- tuXlabs
- FarmBot
- Lawuna

=== Cape Town Open Education Declaration ===
The Cape Town Open Education Declaration is a major international statement on open access, open education and open educational resources. It emerged from a conference on open education hosted in Cape Town on 14 and 15 September 2007 by the foundation and the Open Society Institute. The aim of this meeting [being] to "accelerate efforts to promote open resources, technology, and teaching practices in education". Individuals and organizations that sign the Declaration share its "statement of principle, a statement of strategy and a statement of commitment".

The declaration was released officially on January 22, 2008.

As of January 2014, over 2,400 individuals and 250 organisations (including the Wikimedia Foundation) have signed the declaration.

== See also ==
- Budapest Open Access Initiative
- UNESCO 2012 Paris OER Declaration
