= Open educational resources =

Open learning resource

UNESCO Global Open Educational Resources logo

Open educational resources (OER) are teaching, learning, and research materials that are intentionally created and licensed to be free for the end user to own, share, and in most cases, modify. The term "OER" describes publicly accessible materials and resources for any user to use, re-mix, improve, and redistribute under some licenses. These are designed to reduce accessibility barriers by implementing best practices in teaching and to be adapted for local unique contexts. Enabling these rights in practice may require the availability of source files, the editable formats from which final resources are derived, leading by extension to the proposed notion of "open source educational resources" (OSER).

The development and promotion of open educational resources is often motivated by a desire to provide an alternative or enhanced educational paradigm.

== Definition and scope ==
Open educational resources (OER) are part of a "range of processes" employed by researchers and educators to broaden access to scholarly and creative conversations. Although working definitions of the term OER may vary somewhat based on the context of their use, the 2019 definition provided by UNESCO provides shared language useful for shaping an understanding of the characteristics of OER. The 2019 UNESCO definition describes OER as "teaching, learning and research materials that make use of appropriate tools, such as open licensing, to permit their free reuse, continuous improvement and repurposing by others for educational purposes."

While collaboration, sharing, and openness have "been an ongoing feature of educational" and research practices "past and present", the term "OER" was first coined to describe associated resources at UNESCO's 2002 Forum on Open Courseware, which determined that "Open Educational Resources (OER) are learning, teaching and research materials in any format and medium that reside in the public domain or are under copyright that have been released under an open license, that permit no-cost access, re-use, re-purpose, adaptation and redistribution by others."

Often cited is the 2007 report to the William and Flora Hewlett Foundation which defined OER as "teaching, learning, and research resources that reside in the public domain or have been released under an intellectual property license that permits their free use or re-purposing by others. Open educational resources include full courses, course materials, modules, textbooks, streaming videos, tests, software, and any other tools, materials, or techniques used to support access to knowledge." The Foundation later updated its definition to describe OER as "teaching, learning and research materials in any medium – digital or otherwise – that reside in the public domain or have been released under an open license that permits no-cost access, use, adaptation and redistribution by others with no or limited restrictions." Of note in that definition is the explicit statement that OER can include both digital and non-digital resources, as well as the inclusion of several types of use that OER permit, inspired by 5R activities of OER. In a 2022 overview of the William and Flora Hewlett Foundation's activities supporting open education since 2002, the Foundation describes OER as "freely licensed, remixable learning resources", further including the Creative Commons definition of OER as "teaching, learning, and research materials that are either (a) in the public domain or (b) licensed in a manner that provides everyone with free and perpetual permission to engage in the 5R activities – retaining, remixing, revising, reusing and redistributing the resources."

The 5R activities/permissions mentioned in the definitions above were proposed by David Wiley, and include:

- Retain – the right to make, own, and control copies of the content (e.g., download, duplicate, store, and manage)
- Reuse – the right to use the content in a wide range of ways (e.g., in a class, in a study group, on a website, in a video)
- Revise – the right to adapt, adjust, modify, or alter the content itself (e.g., translate the content into another language)
- Remix – the right to combine the original or revised content with other material to create something new (e.g., incorporate the content into a mashup)
- Redistribute – the right to share copies of the original content, your revisions, or your remixes with others (e.g., give a copy of the content to a friend)

Authors, creators, and communities may apply a range of licenses or descriptions such as those facilitated by Creative Commons or Local Contexts | TK Labels to their work to communicate to what extent they intend for downstream users to engage in the 5R activities or other collaborative research, creative and scholarly practices.

The Organisation for Economic Co-operation and Development (OECD) defines OER as: "digitised materials offered freely and openly for educators, students, and self-learners to use and reuse for teaching, learning, and research. OER includes learning content, software tools to develop, use, and distribute content, and implementation resources such as open licences". By way of comparison, the Commonwealth of Learning "has adopted the widest definition of Open Educational Resources (OER) as 'materials offered freely and openly to use and adapt for teaching, learning, development and research'". The WikiEducator project suggests that OER refers "to educational resources (lesson plans, quizzes, syllabi, instructional modules, simulations, etc.) that are freely available for use, reuse, adaptation, and sharing'. Institutions emphasizing recognition of work with open educational resources in faculty promotion and tenure emphasize their use in research, scholarly and creative works as well.

The above definitions expose some of the tensions that exist with OER:

- Nature of the resource: Several of the definitions above limit the definition of OER to digital resources, while others consider that any educational resource can be included in the definition.
- Source of the resource: While some of the definitions require a resource to be produced with an explicit educational aim in mind, others broaden this to include any resource which may potentially be used for learning.
- Level of openness: Most definitions require that a resource be placed in the public domain or under a fully open license. Others require only that free use to be granted for educational purposes, possibly excluding commercial uses.

These definitions also have common elements, namely they all:

- cover use and reuse, repurposing, and modification of the resources;
- include free use for educational purposes by teachers and learners
- encompass all types of digital media.

Given the diversity of users, creators and sponsors of open educational resources, it is not surprising to find a variety of use cases and requirements. For this reason, it may be as helpful to consider the differences between descriptions of open educational resources as it is to consider the descriptions themselves. One of several tensions in reaching a consensus description of OER (as found in the above definitions) is whether there should be explicit emphasis placed on specific technologies. For example, a video can be openly licensed and freely used without being a streaming video. A book can be openly licensed and freely used without being an electronic document. This technologically driven tension is deeply bound up with the discourse of open-source licensing. For more, see Licensing and Types of OER later in this article.

There is also a tension between entities which find value in quantifying usage of OER and those which see such metrics as themselves being irrelevant to free and open resources. Those requiring metrics associated with OER are often those with economic investment in the technologies needed to access or provide electronic OER, those with economic interests potentially threatened by OER, or those requiring justification for the costs of implementing and maintaining the infrastructure or access to the freely available OER. While a semantic distinction can be made delineating the technologies used to access and host learning content from the content itself, these technologies are generally accepted as part of the collective of open educational resources.

Since OER are intended to be available for a variety of educational purposes, some organizations using OER neither award degrees nor provide academic or administrative support to students seeking college credits towards a diploma from a degree granting accredited institution. However, many degree granting institutions have intentionally embraced the use of OER for research, teaching and learning, seeing their use and creation as in aligning with academic or institutional mission statements. In open education, there is an emerging effort by some accredited institutions to offer free certifications, or achievement badges, to document and acknowledge the accomplishments of participants.

In order for educational resources to be OER, they must have an open license or otherwise communicate willingness for iterative reuse and/or modification. Many educational resources made available on the Internet are geared to allowing online access to digitalized educational content, but the materials themselves are restrictively licensed. These restrictions may complicate the reuse and modification considered characteristic of OER. Often, this is not intentional, as educators and researchers may lack familiarity with copyright law in their own jurisdictions, never mind internationally. International law and national laws of nearly all nations, and certainly of those who have signed onto the World Intellectual Property Organization (WIPO), restrict all content under strict copyright (unless the copyright owner specifically releases it under an open license). The Creative Commons license is a widely used licensing framework internationally used for OER.

== Open source educational resources ==
OER are commonly shared under open licences granting the right to modify resources, while the underlying source files — such as the LaTeX, Markdown or ODT/DOCX files behind a PDF — may not be provided, limiting the practical ability to exercise these rights.

The notion of open source educational resources (OSER) has been proposed to qualify OER whose source files are publicly available, enabling meaningful modification in practice. UNESCO's Recommendation on OER explicitly calls for "developing mechanisms to support and incentivize all stakeholders to publish source files and accessible OER using standard open file formats in public repositories."

For example, the Forge des Communs Numériques Éducatifs, a platform provided by the Ministry of National Education (France) based on GitLab enabling teachers to produce and share open educational resources, introduces the practice of depositing source files.

More broadly, OSER represents an emerging use of the concept of open source beyond software.

== Open textbooks ==
The Open Textbook Library, sponsored by the University of Minnesota, offers open textbooks on a wide range of law, medicine, engineering, and liberal arts disciplines.

OpenStax, a nonprofit educational technology initiative based at Rice University, has created openly licensed textbooks since 2012. The project was initially funded by the Bill & Melinda Gates Foundation, the William and Flora Hewlett Foundation, the Michelson Twenty Million Minds Foundation, and the Maxfield Foundation. The CNX platform was retired in 2020, when OpenStax transitioned to the use of Google Docs instead.

LibreTexts is a nonprofit OER (online educational resource) project. Content from LibreTexts is made available under the CK-12 Foundation Curriculum Materials License. The CK-12 Foundation also provides online a suite of open educational content, typically under that license.

The Pressbooks Directory is a free, searchable catalog that includes over 8,200 open access books published by 199 organizations and networks using Pressbooks.

The B.C. Open Collection by BCcampus is a curated selection of OER that includes courses and textbooks that must meet quality criteria to be added to the collection.

The MERLOT Collection is a curated resource of free and online textbooks and other resources for use in teaching and learning. Many resources undergo an extensive peer review.

OER Commons provides an extensive library of OER textbooks and resources from higher education institutions around the world, as well as an OER authoring tool called Open Author.

== History ==
The term "learning object" was coined in 1994 by Wayne Hodgins and quickly gained currency among educators and instructional designers, popularizing the idea that digital materials can be designed to allow easy reuse in a wide range of teaching and learning situations.

The OER movement originated from developments in open and distance learning (ODL) and in the wider context of a culture of open knowledge, open source, free sharing and peer collaboration, which emerged in the late 20th century. OER and Free/Libre Open Source Software (FLOSS), for instance, have many aspects in common, This connection was first established in 1998 by David Wiley, who coined the term "open content" and introduced the concept by analogy with open source. Richard Baraniuk made the same connection independently in 1999 with the founding of the first global OER initiative, Connexions (now called OpenStax CNX).

The MIT OpenCourseWare project is credited for having sparked a global Open Educational Resources Movement after announcing in 2001 that it was going to put MIT's entire course catalog online and launching this project in 2002. Other contemporaneous OER projects include Connexions, which was launched by Richard Baraniuk in 1999 and showcased with MIT OpenCourseWare at the launch of the Creative Commons open licenses in 2002, and the NROC Project, launched by Gary W. Lopez in 2003 that developed the HippoCampus OER site and EdReady personalized learning platform. Following an MIT OpenCourseWare conference in Beijing, the China Open Resources for Education (CORE) was established in November 2003. CORE's goal was to provide these resources to hundreds of universities in China. In a first manifestation of this movement, MIT entered into a partnership with Utah State University, wherein David Wiley, an assistant professor of instructional technology, set up a distributed peer support network for the OCW's content through voluntary, self-organizing communities of interest. The community college system was also an early participant in the movement. In 2004, the Sofia project was launched by the Foothill-De Anza Community College District with funding support from The William and Flora Hewlett Foundation. Content for eight community-college level courses was provided online for free, in what was termed an "open content initiative."

The term "open educational resources" was first adopted at UNESCO's 2002 Forum on the Impact of Open Courseware for Higher Education in Developing Countries.

In 2005 OECD's Centre for Educational Research and Innovation (CERI) launched a 20-month study to analyse and map the scale and scope of initiatives regarding "open educational resources" in terms of their purpose, content, and funding. The report "Giving Knowledge for Free: The Emergence of Open Educational Resources", published in May 2007, is the main output of the project, which involved a number of expert meetings in 2006.

In September 2007, the Open Society Institute and the Shuttleworth Foundation convened a meeting in Cape Town to which thirty leading proponents of open education were invited to collaborate on the text of a manifesto. The Cape Town Open Education Declaration was released on 22 January 2008, urging governments and publishers to make publicly funded educational materials available at no charge via the internet. On 30 March 2010, President Barack Obama signed the Health Care and Education Reconciliation Act, which included $2 billion over four years to fund the TAACCCT program, which is described as "the largest OER (open education resources) initiative in the world and uniquely focused on creating curricula in partnership with industry for credentials in vocational industry sectors like manufacturing, health, energy, transportation, and IT".

The global movement for OER culminated at the 1st World OER Congress convened in Paris on 20–22 June 2012 by UNESCO, COL and other partners. The resulting Paris OER Declaration (2012) reaffirmed the shared commitment of international organizations, governments, and institutions to promoting the open licensing and free sharing of publicly funded content, the development of national policies and strategies on OER, capacity-building, and open research. In 2018, the 2nd World OER Congress in Ljubljana, Slovenia, was co-organized by UNESCO and the Government of Slovenia. The 500 experts and national delegates from 111 countries adopted the Ljubljana OER Action Plan. It recommends 41 actions to mainstream open-licensed resources to achieve the 2030 Sustainable Development Goal 4 on "quality and lifelong education".

An historical antecedent to consider is the pedagogy of artist Joseph Beuys and the founding of the Free International University for Creativity and Interdisciplinary Research in 1973. After co-creating with his students, in 1967, the German Student Party, Beuys was dismissed from his teaching post in 1972 at the Staatliche Kunstakademie Düsseldorf. The institution did not approve of the fact that he permitted 50 students who had been rejected from admission to study with him. The Free University became increasingly involved in political and radical actions calling for a revitalization and restructuring of educational systems.

== Advantages and disadvantages ==
Advantages of using OER include:

- Expanded access to learning – can be accessed anywhere at any time
- Ability to modify course materials – can be narrowed down to topics that are relevant to course
- Enhancement of course material – texts, images and videos can be used to support different approaches to learning
- Rapid dissemination of information – textbooks can be put forward quicker online than publishing a textbook
- Cost saving for students – all readings are available online, which saves students hundreds of dollars
- Cost savings for educators - lectures and lessons plans are available online, saving educator time, effort and money, while learning new knowledge
- Consolidate the foundation for more reproducible and inclusive science
- Improve the quality of research produced by future generation of researchers
- Removes barriers to entry and facilitate career progression by offering students to be involved in knowledge generation, enhancing diversity and representation within science.

Challenges of using OER include:

- Quality/reliability concerns – some online material can be edited by anyone at any time, which may result in irrelevant or inaccurate information
- Limitation of copyright property protection – OER licenses change "All rights reserved." into "Some rights reserved.", so that content creators must be intentional about what materials they make available
- Technology issues – some students may have difficulty accessing online resources because of slow internet connection, or may not have access to the software required to use the materials
- Languages in which OER are distributed – use of English as primary language of delivery may limit its use
- Awareness within educational institutions – limits use of OER for research, teaching and learning

== Licensing and types ==
Turning a resource into an open educational resource

Open educational resources often involve issues relating to intellectual property rights. Traditional commercial educational materials, such as textbooks, are protected under conventional copyright terms. However, alternative and more flexible licensing options have become available as a result of the work of Creative Commons, a non-profit organization that provides ready-made licensing agreements that are less restrictive than the "all rights reserved" terms of standard international copyright. These new options have become a "critical infrastructure service for the OER movement." The GNU Free Documentation License is another license intended for textbooks and instructional manuals. Another license, typically used by developers of OER software, is the GNU General Public License from the free and open-source software (FOSS) community. Open licensing allows uses of the materials that would not be easily permitted under copyright alone.

Massive open online courses (MOOCs) are free online courses available to anyone who wants to enroll. MOOCs offer a wide range of courses in many different subjects to allow people to learn in an affordable and easy manner.

Types of open educational resources include full courses, course materials, modules, learning objects, open textbooks, openly licensed (often streamed) videos, tests, software, and other tools, materials, or techniques used to support access to knowledge. OER may be freely and openly available static resources, dynamic resources which change over time in the course of having knowledge seekers interacting with and updating them, or a course or module with a combination of these resources.

== OER policy ==
OER policies (also sometimes known as laws, regulations, strategies, guidelines, principles or tenets) are adopted by governments, institutions or organisations in support of the creation and use of open content, specifically open educational resources, and related open educational practices.

== Research ==
The growing movement of OER has also fostered research activities on OER across the world, becoming "a mission-driven trend within the scientific literature". Mishra et al. (2022) found topics of research into OER included "open textbook, open online course, open courseware, open-source software related to open education, and open social learning." The Open Education Group suggests sorting research into four categories, called COUP Framework, based on the focus of research. Members of the Global OER Graduate Network (GO-GN) have enacted research responding to critiques of open education research as "under-theorized" and exploring the role of OER as well as open practices and processes in "embracing and foregrounding diversity, inclusion and equity."

As part of the Open Education Group, Hilton (2016, 2019) reviewed studies on OER with the focus on Cost, Outcomes, and Perceptions, finding that most of the studies (e.g. Fischer, Hilton, Robinson, & Wiley, 2015; Lovett, Meyer, & Thille, 2008; Petrides, Jimes, Middleton-Detzner, Walling, & Wiess, 2011) had found that OER improve student learning while significantly reducing the cost of their educational resources (e.g. textbooks). He also found that perceptions of OER by faculty and students are generally positive (e.g. Allen & Seaman, 2014; Bliss, Hilton, Wiley, & Thanos, 2013).

The approaches proposed in the COUP framework have also been used internationally (e.g. Pandra & Santosh, 2017; Afolabi, 2017), although contexts and OER use types vary across countries. The COUP Framework explores:

Cost: the impact of OER adoption on cost reduction
Outcomes: the impact of OER adoption/use on student learning
Usage: the impact of and practices around customization of OER
Perceptions: faculty's and students' perceptions of OER

Studies continue to emerge which investigate the usage of OER which contribute to understanding of how faculty and student use of OER (enabled by the permission given by an open license) contribute to student learning. For example, research from the Czech Republic has proved most students said they use OER as often as or more often than classical materials. Wikipedia is the most used resource. Availability, amount of information and easy orientation are the most value benefits of OER usage (Petiška, 2018)

A 2018 Charles University study presents that Wikipedia is the most used OER for students of environmental studies (used by 95% of students) and argues educational institutions should focus their attention on it (e.g. by hosting and supporting a Wikipedian in residence).

To encourage more researchers to join in the field of OER, the Open Education Group has created an "OER Research Fellowship" program, which selects 15–30 doctoral students and early career researchers in North America (US and Canada). To date, more than 50 researchers have joined the program and conducted research on OER. The Open University in UK has run another program aimed at supporting doctoral students researching OER from any country in the world through their GO-GN network (Global OER Graduate Network). GO-GN provides its members with funding and networking opportunities as well as research support. Currently, more than 60 students are listed as its members. At every Institute and Universities level, each and everyone Student and Research scholar should aware of open educational resources and how to Implement the license should be educated and make all them to do hands on session. However, the evidence underlying pedagogical research conducted on OER is found to be of a poor quality and requires a more rigorous design to find how it improves scientific literacy, student engagement and student attitudes towards science.

== Open educational practices ==
OER have been used in educational contexts in a variety of ways, and researchers and practitioners have proposed different names for such practices. According to Wiley & Hilton (2018), the two popular terms used are "open pedagogy" and "open educational practices". What these two terms refer to is closely related to each other, often indistinguishable. For example, Weller (2013) defines open pedagogy as follows: "Open pedagogy makes use of this abundant, open content (such as open educational resources, videos, podcasts), but also places an emphasis on the network and the learner's connections within this". Open educational practices are defined as, for example, "a set of activities around instructional design and implementation of events and processes intended to support learning. They also include the creation, use and repurposing of Open Educational Resources (OER) and their adaptation to the contextual setting (the Open Educational Quality Initiative). Wiley & Hilton (2018) proposed a new term called "OER-enabled pedagogy", which is defined as "the set of teaching and learning practices that are only possible or practical in the context of the 5R permissions which are characteristic of OER", emphasizing the 5R permissions enabled by the use of open licenses. Moore has suggested that the Open Education movement, see do not see OER as a Zero sum game, but judge their OERs on eight criteria.

== Costs ==
One of the most frequently cited benefits of OER is their potential to reduce costs. A 2023 study co-authored by the Public Interest Research Group and Michelson 20MM Foundation found that 65% of student respondents skipped out on textbooks or course materials because they were too expensive. While OER seem well placed to bring down total expenditures, they are not cost-free. New OER can be assembled or simply reused or repurposed from existing open resources. This is a primary strength of OER and, as such, can produce major cost savings. OER need not be created from scratch. On the other hand, there are some costs in the assembly and adaptation process. And some OER must be created and produced originally at some time. While OER must be hosted and disseminated, and some require funding, OER development can take different routes, such as creation, adoption, adaptation and curation.

Each of these models provides different cost structure and degree of cost-efficiency. Upfront costs in developing the OER infrastructure can be expensive, such as building the OER infrastructure. Butcher and Hoosen noted that "a key argument put forward by those who have written about the potential benefits of OER relates to its potential for saving cost or, at least, creating significant economic efficiencies. However, to date there has been limited presentation of concrete data to back up this assertion, which reduces the effectiveness of such arguments and opens the OER movement to justified academic criticism."

== Institutional support ==
A large part of the early work on open educational resources was funded by universities and foundations such as the William and Flora Hewlett Foundation, which was the main financial supporter of open educational resources in the early years and has spent more than $110 million in the 2002 to 2010 period, of which more than $14 million went to MIT. The Shuttleworth Foundation, which focuses on projects concerning collaborative content creation, has contributed as well. With the British government contributing £5.7m, institutional support has also been provided by the UK funding bodies JISC and HEFCE. The JISC/HEFCE UKOER Programme (Phase 3 from October 2011 – October 2012) was meant to build on sustainable procedure indicated in the first two phases eventually expanding in new directions that connect Open Educational Resources to other fields of work.

United Nations Educational, Scientific and Cultural Organization (UNESCO) is taking a leading role in "making countries aware of the potential of OER." The organisation has instigated debate on how to apply OERs in practice and chaired vivid discussions on this matter through its International Institute of Educational Planning (IIEP). Believing that OERs can widen access to quality education, particularly when shared by many countries and higher education institutions, UNESCO also champions OERs as a means of promoting access, equity and quality in the spirit of the Universal Declaration of Human Rights. In 2012 the Paris OER Declaration was approved during the 2012 OER World Congress held at UNESCO's headquarters in Paris.

As of 2022, many institutions of higher education provide a broad range of support for instructors and faculty incorporating open practices, including the adoption, modification and creation of OER. Support provided may include financial stipends, course release, instructional design assistance, research expertise and recognition in retention, promotion and tenure. Manowaluilou (2020) conducted research on the use of Open Educational Resources (OER) in higher education, particularly focusing on their role in enhancing academic English writing. The study highlights that OER can serve as valuable supplemental resources for students, potentially alleviating the need for professors to dedicate significant time and resources to teaching writing skills. This approach may improve learning efficiency and accessibility within academic environments.

== Initiatives ==
SkillsCommons was developed in 2012 under the California State University Chancellor's Office and funded through the $2 billion U.S. Department of Labor's TAACCCT initiative. Led by Assistant Vice Chancellor, Gerard Hanley, and modeled after sister project, MERLOT, SkillsCommons open workforce development content was developed and vetted by 700 community colleges and other TAACCCT institutions across the United States. The SkillsCommons content exceeded two million downloads in September 2019 and at that time was considered to be the world's largest repository of open educational and workforce training materials.

A parallel initiative, OpenStax CNX (formerly Connexions), came out of Rice University starting in 1999. In the beginning, the Connexions project focused on creating an open repository of user-generated content. In contrast to the OCW projects, content licenses are required to be open under a Creative Commons Attribution International 4.0 (CC BY) license. The hallmark of Connexions is the use of a custom XML format CNXML, designed to aid and enable mixing and reuse of the content.

In 2012, OpenStax was created from the basis of the Connexions project. In contrast to user-generated content libraries, OpenStax hires subject matter experts to create college-level textbooks that are peer-reviewed, openly licensed, and available online for free. Like the content in OpenStax CNX, OpenStax books are available under Creative Commons CC BY licenses that allow users to reuse, remix, and redistribute content as long as they provide attribution. OpenStax's stated mission is to create professional grade textbooks for the highest-enrollment undergraduate college courses that are the same quality as traditional textbooks, but are adaptable and available free to students.

Other initiatives derived from MIT OpenCourseWare are China Open Resources for Education and OpenCourseWare in Japan. The OpenCourseWare Consortium, founded in 2005 to extend the reach and impact of open course materials and foster new open course materials, counted more than 200 member institutions from around the world in 2009.

OER Africa is an initiative established by the South African Institute for Distance Education (Saide) to play a leading role in driving the development and use of OER across all education sectors on the African continent. The OER4Schools project focusses on the use of Open Educational Resources in teacher education in sub-Saharan Africa.

Wikiwijs (the Netherlands) was a program intended to promote the use of open educational resources (OER) in the Dutch education sector;

The Open Educational Resources Programme (phases one and two) (United Kingdom) was funded by HEFCE, the UK Higher Education Academy and Joint Information Systems Committee (JISC), which has supported pilot projects and activities around the open release of learning resources, for free use and repurposing worldwide.

In 2003, the ownership of Wikipedia and Wiktionary projects was transferred to the Wikimedia Foundation, a non-profit charitable organization whose goal is to collect and develop free educational content and to disseminate it effectively and globally. Wikipedia ranks in the top-ten most visited websites worldwide since 2007.

OER Commons was spearheaded in 2007 by the Institute for the Study of Knowledge Management in Education (ISKME), a nonprofit education research institute dedicated to innovation in open education content and practices, as a way to aggregate, share, and promote open educational resources to educators, administrators, parents, and students. OER Commons also provides educators tools to align OER to the Common Core State Standards; to evaluate the quality of OER to OER Rubrics; and to contribute and share OERs with other teachers and learners worldwide. To further promote the sharing of these resources among educators, in 2008 ISKME launched the OER Commons Teacher Training Initiative, which focuses on advancing open educational practices and on building opportunities for systemic change in teaching and learning.

One of the first OER resources for K-12 education is Curriki. A nonprofit organization, Curriki provides an Internet site for open-source curriculum (OSC) development, to provide universal access to free curricula and instructional materials for students up to the age of 18 (K-12). By applying the open source process to education, Curriki empowers educational professionals to become an active community in the creation of good curricula. Kim Jones serves as Curriki's Executive Director.

In August 2006 WikiEducator was launched to provide a venue for planning education projects built on OER, creating and promoting open education resources (OERs), and networking towards funding proposals. Its Wikieducator's Learning4Content project builds skills in the use of MediaWiki and related free software technologies for mass collaboration in the authoring of free content and claims to be the world's largest wiki training project for education. By 30 June 2009 the project facilitated 86 workshops training 3,001 educators from 113 countries.

Between 2006 and 2007, as a Transversal Action under the European eLearning Programme, the Open e-Learning Content Observatory Services (OLCOS) project carries out a set of activities that aim at fostering the creation, sharing and re-use of Open Educational Resources (OER) in Europe and beyond. The main result of OLCOS was a Roadmap, in order to provide decision makers with an overview of current and likely future developments in OER and recommendations on how various challenges in OER could be addressed.

Peer production has also been utilized in producing collaborative open education resources (OERs). Writing Commons, an international open textbook spearheaded by Joe Moxley at the University of South Florida, has evolved from a print textbook into a crowd-sourced resource for college writers around the world. Massive open online course (MOOC) platforms have also generated interest in building online eBooks. The Cultivating Change Community (CCMOOC) at the University of Minnesota is one such project founded entirely on a grassroots model to generate content. In 10 weeks, 150 authors contributed more than 50 chapters to the CCMOOC eBook and companion site.

In 2011–12, academicians from the University of Mumbai, India, created an OER Portal with free resources on Micro Economics, Macro Economics, and Soft Skills – available for global learners.

Another project is the Free Education Initiative from the Saylor Foundation, which is currently more than 80% of the way towards its initial goal of providing 241 college-level courses across 13 subject areas. The Saylor Foundation makes use of university and college faculty members and subject experts to assist in this process, as well as to provide peer review of each course to ensure its quality. The foundation also supports the creation of new openly licensed materials where they are not already available as well as through its Open Textbook Challenge.

In 2010 the University of Birmingham and the London School of Economics worked together on the HEA and JISC funded DELILA project, the main aim of the project was to release a small sample of open educational resources to support embedding digital and information literacy education into institutional teacher training courses accredited by the HEA including PGCerts and other CPD courses. One of the main barriers that the project found to sharing resources in information literacy was copyright that belonged to commercial database providers

In 2006, the African Virtual University (AVU) released 73 modules of its Teacher Education Programs as open education resources to make the courses freely available for all. In 2010, the AVU developed the OER Repository which has contributed to increase the number of Africans that use, contextualize, share and disseminate the existing as well as future academic content. The online portal serves as a platform where the 219 modules of Mathematics, Physics, Chemistry, Biology, ICT in education, and teacher education professional courses are published. The modules are available in three different languages – English, French, and Portuguese – making the AVU the leading African institution in providing and using open education resources

In August 2013, Tidewater Community College become the first college in the U.S. to create an Associate of Science degree based entirely on openly licensed content – the "Z-Degree". The combined efforts of a 13-member faculty team, college staff and administration culminated when students enrolled in the first "z-courses" which are based solely on OER. The goals of this initiative were twofold: 1) to improve student success, and 2) to increase instructor effectiveness. Courses were stripped down to the Learning Outcomes and rebuilt using openly licensed content, reviewed and selected by the faculty developer based on its ability to facilitate student achievement of the objectives. The 21 z-courses that make up an associate of science degree in business administration were launched simultaneously across four campus locations. TCC is the 11th largest public two-year college in the nation, enrolling nearly 47,000 students annually.

During this same period from 2013 to 2014, Northern Virginia Community College (NOVA) also created two zero-cost OER degree pathways: one an associate degree in General Studies, the other an associate degree in Social Science. One of the largest community colleges in the nation, NOVA serves around 75,000 students across six campuses. NOVA Online (formerly known as the Extended Learning Institute or ELI) is the centralized online learning hub for NOVA, and it was through ELI that NOVA launched their OER-Based General Education Project. Dr. Wm. Preston Davis, Director of Instructional Services at NOVA Online, led the ELI team of faculty, instructional designers and librarians on the project to create what NOVA calls "digital open" courses. During the planning phase, the team was careful to select core, high-enrollment courses that could impact as many students as possible, regardless of specific course of study. At the same time, the team looked beyond individual courses to create depth and quality around full pathways for students to earn an entire degree. From Fall 2013 to Fall 2016, more than 15,000 students had enrolled in NOVA OER courses yielding textbook cost savings of over 2 million dollars over the three-year period. Currently, NOVA is working to add a third OER degree pathway in Liberal Arts.

Nordic OER is a Nordic network to promote open education and collaboration amongst stakeholders in all educational sectors. The network has members from all Nordic countries and facilitates discourse and dialogue on open education but also participates in projects and development programs. The network is supported by the Nordic OER project co-funded by Nordplus.

In Norway the Norwegian Digital Learning Arena (NDLA) is a joint county enterprise offering open digital learning resources for upper secondary education. In addition to being a compilation of open educational resources, NDLA provides a range of other online tools for sharing and cooperation. At project startup in 2006, increased volume and diversity were seen as significant conditions for the introduction of free learning material in upper secondary education. The incentive was an amendment imposing the counties to provide free educational material, in print as well as digital, including digital hardware.

In Sweden there is a growing interest in open publication and the sharing of educational resources but the pace of development is still slow. There are many questions to be dealt with in this area; for universities, academic management and teaching staff. Teachers in all educational sectors require support and guidance to be able to use OER pedagogically and with quality in focus. To realize the full potential of OER for students' learning it is not enough to make patchwork use of OER – resources have to be put into context. Valuable teacher time should be used for contextual work and not simply for the creation of content. The aim of the project OER for learning OERSweden is to stimulate an open discussion about collaboration in infrastructural questions regarding open online knowledge sharing. A network of ten universities led by Karlstad University will arrange a series of open webinars during the project period focusing on the use and production of open educational resources. A virtual platform for Swedish OER initiatives and resources will also be developed. The project intends to focus in particular on how OER affects teacher trainers and decision makers. The objectives of the project are: To increase the level of national collaboration between universities and educational organisations in the use and production of OER, To find effective online methods to support teachers and students, in terms of quality, technology and retrievability of OER, To raise awareness for the potential of webinars as a tool for open online learning, To increase the level of collaboration between universities' support functions and foster national resource sharing, with a base in modern library and educational technology units, and To contribute to the creation of a national university structure for tagging, distribution and storage of OER.

Founded in 2007, the CK-12 Foundation is a California-based non-profit organization whose stated mission is to reduce the cost of, and increase access to, K-12 education in the United States and worldwide. CK-12 provides free and fully customizable K-12 open educational resources aligned to state curriculum standards and tailored to meet student and teacher needs. The foundation's tools are used by 38,000 schools in the US, and additional international schools.

LATIn Project brings a Collaborative Open Textbook Initiative for Higher Education tailored specifically for Latin America. This initiative encourages and supports local professors and authors to contribute with individual sections or chapters that could be assembled into customized books by the whole community. The created books are freely available to the students in an electronic format or could be legally printed at low cost because there is no license or fees to be paid for their distribution, since they are all released as OER with a Creative Commons CC BY-SA license. This solution also contributes to the creation of customized textbooks where each professor could select the sections appropriate for their courses or could freely adapt existing sections to their needs. Also, the local professors will be the sink and source of the knowledge, contextualized to the Latin American Higher Education system.

In 2014, the William and Flora Hewlett Foundation started funding the establishment of an OER World Map that documents OER initiatives around the world. Since 2015, the hbz and graphthinking GmbH develop the service with funding by the Hewlett Foundation. The first version of the website was launched in March 2015 and the website had been continuously developing. The OER World Map invited people to enter a personal profile as well to add their organization, OER project or service to the database. The service was shut down in April 2022.

In March 2015, Eliademy.com launched the crowdsourcing of OER courses under CC licence. The platform expects to collect 5000 courses during the first year that can be reused by teachers worldwide.

In 2015, the University of Idaho Doceo Center launched open course content for K-12 schools, with the purpose of improving awareness of OER among K-12 educators. This was shortly followed by an Open Textbook Crash Course, which provides K-12 educators with basic knowledge about copyright, open licensing, and attribution. Results of these projects have been used to inform research into how to support K-12 educator OER adoption literacies and the diffusion of open practices.

In 2015, the MGH Institute of Health Professions, with help from an Institute of Museum and Library Services Grant (#SP-02-14-0), launched the Open Access Course Reserves (OACR). With the idea that many college level courses rely on more than a single textbook to deliver information to students, the OACR is inspired by library courses reserves in that it supplies entire reading lists for typical courses. Faculty can find, create, and share reading lists of open access materials.

Today, OER initiatives across the United States rely on individual college and university librarians to curate resources into lists on library content management systems called LibGuides.

In response to COVID-19, the Principal Institute has partnered with Fieth Consulting, LLC, California State University's SkillsCommons and MERLOT to create a free online resource hub designed to help Administrators, Teachers, Students, and Families more effectively support teaching and learning online.

Several universities of higher education, initiated OER : notable OER sites are Open Michigan, BCcampus Open Textbook collection, RMIT, Open access at Oxford University Press, Maryland Open Source Textbook (M.O.S.T.), OpenEd@UCL, OER initiative by the University of Edinburgh, etc. There were several initiatives taken by faculties of higher education, such as Affordability Counts by faculties across Florida state universities and colleges and Affordable Learning Georgia which is across public Georgian institutions. The North Dakota University System was appropriated funding from the North Dakota state legislature to train instructors to adopt OER and has a repository of OER.

There were several initiatives taken by faculties of higher education, such as Affordability Counts by faculties across Florida state universities and colleges and also by individual faculties offering free textbooks affordable by initiating Green tea press.

Oregon Open Educational Resources offers a wide variety of open textbooks and resources that community college and university instructors are using to reduce textbook costs in their courses.

The Universal Open Textbook Initiative was launched in 2024 to curate and translate open textbooks to improve the quality and accessibility of educational resources worldwide.

=== International programs ===
High hopes have been voiced for OERs to alleviate the digital divide between the global North and the global South, and to make a contribution to the development of less advanced economies.

- Europe – Learning Resource Exchange for schools (LRE) is a service launched by European Schoolnet in 2004 enabling educators to find multilingual open educational resources from many different countries and providers. Currently, more than 200,000 learning resources are searchable in one portal based on language, subject, resource type and age range.
- India – National Council Of Educational Research and Training (NCERT) digitized all its textbooks from 1st standard to 12th standard. The textbooks are available online for free. Central Institute of Educational Technology (CIET), a constituent Unit of NCERT, digitized more than thousand audio and video programmes. All the educational AV material developed by CIET is presently available at Sakshat Portal an initiative of Ministry of Human Resources and Development. In addition, National Repository for Open Educational Resources (NROER) houses a variety of e-content.
- US – Washington State's Open Course Library Project is a collection of expertly developed educational materials – including textbooks, syllabi, course activities, readings, and assessments – for 81 high-enrolling college courses. All course have now been released and are providing faculty with a high-quality option that will cost students no more than $30 per course. However, a study found that very few classes were actually using these materials.
- Japan – Since its launch in 2005, Japan OpenCourseWare Consortium (JOCW) has been actively promoting OER movement in Japan with more than 20 institutional members.
- Dominica – The Free Curricula Centre at New World University expands the utility of existing OER textbooks by creating and curating supplemental videos to accompany them, and by converting them to the EPUB format for better display on smartphones and tablets.
- Bangladesh is the first country to digitize a complete set of textbooks for grades 1–12. Distribution is free to all.
- Uruguay sought up to 1,000 digital learning resources in a Request For Proposals (RFP) in June 2011.
- In 2011, South Korea announced a plan to digitize all of its textbooks and to provide all students with computers and digitized textbooks by 2015.
- The California Learning Resources Network Free Digital Textbook Initiative at high school level, initiated by former Gov. Arnold Schwarzenegger.
- The Michigan Department of Education provided $600,000 to create the Michigan Open Book Project in 2014. The initial selection of OER textbooks in history, economics, geography and social studies was issued in August 2015. There has been significant negative reaction to the materials' inaccuracies, design flaws and confusing distribution.
- The Shuttleworth Foundation's Free High School Science Texts for South Africa
- Saudi Arabia had a comprehensive project in 2008 to digitize and improve the Math and Science text books in all K-12 grades.
- Saudi Arabia started a project in 2011 to digitize all text books other than Math and Science.
- The Arab League Educational, Cultural and Scientific Organization (ALECSO) and the U.S. State Department launched an Open Book Project in 2013, supporting "the creation of Arabic-language open educational resources (OERs)".

With the advent of growing international awareness and implementation of open educational resources, a global OER logo was adopted for use in multiple languages by UNESCO. The design of the Global OER logo creates a common global visual idea, representing "subtle and explicit representations of the subjects and goals of OER". Its full explanation and recommendation of use is available from UNESCO.

== Major academic conferences ==
- Open Education Conference – held annually in North America (US and Canada)
- OER Conference – held annually in Europe
- OE Global Conference – run by Open Education Global and held annually in a variety of locations across the world
- Creative Commons Global Summit – Creative Commons hosts its global summit annually and one of the main topics is Open Education and OER.

== OER competence development, OER training and OER certification ==
There are various approaches and efforts focused on developing OER competencies. One notable framework is Organisation internationale de la Francophonie's OER Competency Framework, which outlines essential skills and knowledge for effective OER use. Researchers funded by Austria's Federal Ministry of Education, Science and Research and the 2020-2024 Open Education Austria Advanced project found that of 2021, few higher education institutions had comprehensive certificates for OER training, though many institutions offered singular workshops or incentives for OER development. In 2022, Austria launched a certification process for OER adoption and expansion. The certification requires Austrian higher education to show and verify their activities and competencies for OER training, policy, classroom use, and sustainability at their institution.

== Critical discourse about OER as a movement ==
=== External discourse ===
The OER movement has been accused of insularity and failure to connect globally: "OERs will not be able to help countries reach their educational goals unless awareness of their power and potential can rapidly be expanded beyond the communities of interest that they have already attracted."

More fundamentally, doubts were cast on the altruistic motives typically claimed by OERs. The project itself was accused of imperialism because the economic, political, and cultural preferences of highly developed countries determine the creation and dissemination of knowledge that can be used by less-developed countries and may be a self-serving imposition.

To counter the general dominance of OER from the developed countries, the Research on Open Educational Resources for Development (ROER4D) research project, aims to study how OER can be produced in the global south (developing countries) which can meet the local needs of the institutions and people. It seeks to understand in what ways, and under what circumstances can the adoption of OER address the increasing demand for accessible, relevant, high-quality and affordable post-secondary education in the Global South.

One of the sub-projects of Research on OER for development project aimed to work with teachers from government schools in Karnataka, to collaboratively create OER, including in the Kannada language spoken in the state. The aim was to create a model where teachers in public education systems (who number hundreds of thousands in most countries) can collaborate to create and publish OER.

=== Internal discourse ===
Within the open educational resources movement, the concept of OER is active. Consider, for example, the conceptions of gratis versus libre knowledge as found in the discourse about massive open online courses, which may offer free courses but charge for end-of-course awards or course verification certificates from commercial entities. A second example of essentially contested ideas in OER can be found in the usage of different OER logos which can be interpreted as indicating more or less allegiance to the notion of OER as a global movement.

Stephen Downes has argued that, from a connectivist perspective, the production of OER is ironic because "in the final analysis, we cannot produce knowledge for people. Period. The people who are benefiting from these open education resource initiatives are the people who are producing these resources."

== See also ==
- Bookboon – Digital learning service provider (adware)
- Distance education – Mode of delivering education to students who are not physically present
- Educational research – Collection and analysis of evidence in the field of education
- Educational technology – Use of technology in education to enhance learning and teaching
- Flexbook – Textbook authoring platform developed by the CK-12 Foundation (CC BY-NC)
- Free education – Education funded by taxation
- Free and open-source software – Freely licensed software with open code
- Internet Archive – American non-profit digital archive
- Khan Academy – Nonprofit educational organization
- Language MOOC – Online language course
- Libre knowledge – Free licensed works in any field
- LibreTexts – Open access educational resource collection
- List of free educational software
- List of online educational resources
- North Carolina Learning Object Repository
- OER Project – Project for global teaching of Big History
- OER Commons – Freely accessible online library
- Online credentials for learning
- Open educational practices in Australia – Open learning resource
- Open educational resources in Canada – Open learning resource
- Open access – Unrestricted availability of scholarly publications
- Open Library – Online project for book data of the Internet Archive
- OpenCourseWare – University courses published for free online
- OpenEd – Online catalog of educational media
- OpenLearn – Open University's OpenCourseWare website
- Outline of open educational resources – Overview of and topical guide to open educational resources
- PhET Interactive Simulations – Non-profit open educational resource project
- Project Gutenberg – Online digital book library
- Question and Test Interoperability specification – Specification for assessment contents and results representation
- George Siemens – Canadian academic
- Virginia Open Education Foundation – US not-for-profit corporation
