= Saylor University =

Non-profit initiative offering free and open online education

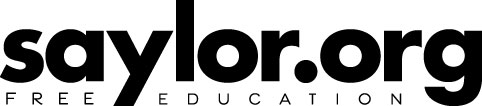
- Founded: 1999
- Founder: Michael J. Saylor
- Type: Operating private foundation (IRS exemption status): 501(c)(3)
- Location: Washington, D.C., Fort Lauderdale, Florida
- Website: www.saylor.org
- Formerly called: Saylor Foundation, Saylor Academy

The Saylor University, formerly known as the Saylor Foundation and Saylor Academy, is a non-profit organization headquartered in Washington, DC. It was established in 1999 by its sole trustee, Michael J. Saylor. Since 2008, the focus of the foundation has been its Free Education Initiative which has led to the creation of 241 courses representing 10 of the highest enrollment majors in the US.

The Saylor Academy assembles courses from openly available texts and resources. The foundation also funds the creation of new materials when needed, which are then openly licensed for use by other organizations and individuals. In March 2018 Edovo partnered with Saylor Academy.

== Courses ==
On its website, the foundation offers 317 free, college-level courses, which are selected as typical courses in high enrollment majors at traditional U.S. colleges. Content is accessible without needing to register or log into the website; however an account is required to gain access to final exams and a free certificate of completion.

The foundation works with consultants to design the courses, typically university and college faculty members or subject experts. The consultants develop a blueprint for the course, then research open educational resources (OER) to supply the course with lectures, texts, and other resources. If suitable texts and documents are not found, the foundation works with faculty to compile new materials which it releases to the OER community under a Creative Commons license. Each course is accompanied by an assessment.

== Credentialing ==
The Saylor University offers some courses with college credit recommendations from the National College Credit Recommendation Service, a program of the University of the State of New York, and through the ACE National Guide, a program of the American Council on Education. According to the Saylor Academy, they have experimented with digital badges through the Open Badge Infrastructure.

Saylor University courses can be transferred for credit towards undergraduate degrees. Saylor University, on March 17th, 2026, was approved by the Florida Department of Education's Commission for Independent Education to operate as Saylor University and over the previous year had received approval to run four master's degree programs in the area of business.
