= Open Learning for Development =

Open Training Platform

Open learning for development describes the Open Training Platform, a UNESCO-driven online hub offering free training and learning resources on a wide range of development topics. Its ultimate goal is to help developing countries around the world and foster cooperation to provide free and open content for development.

UNESCO has launched this platform on the internet to make available training and capacity-building programmes and resources. These are developed by a variety of stakeholders worldwide in a wide range of subjects, including literacy, computers, business, environment, community development and much more.

The Open Training Platform initiative regroups partners from all UN agencies (FAO, ILO/ITC, ITU, UNESCO, the UNITAR, UNV, WHO and UNEP), worldwide development practitioners and agencies, as well as regional and local NGOs and CBOs.
