= Commonwealth of Learning =

Intergovernmental organisation

- Abbreviation: COL
- Founded: 1987; 39 years ago
- Type: Intergovernmental organisation
- Purpose: To help member states and institutions to use distance learning and technologies for expanding access to education and training
- Headquarters: Vancouver, British Columbia, Canada
- Members: The 56 member states of the Commonwealth of Nations
- President and Chief Executive Officer: Professor Peter Scott
- Parent organisation: The Commonwealth
- Website: www.col.org

The Commonwealth of Learning (COL) is an intergovernmental organisation of The Commonwealth headquartered in Vancouver, British Columbia, Canada. Working collaboratively with governmental and non-governmental organizations and other institutions in the Commonwealth, as well as with international development agencies, COL has the mandate to promote the use of open learning and distance education knowledge, resources and technologies. The Board of Governors is chaired by Danny Faure, former President of Seychelles.

== History ==
COL was founded at the 1987 Commonwealth Heads of Government Meeting (CHOGM) and inaugurated in 1988. Its title is a phrase used by philosopher John Locke to describe the body of knowledge developed over time by scientists and other thinkers, for the benefit of all people. At the time of its founding, COL focused on promoting economic development by providing education and teaching skills.

In 2024, Professor Peter Scott was appointed President and Chief Executive Officer of COL.

In 2015, COL created a six-year strategic plan to align itself with the Sustainable Development Goals (SDGs), specifically SDG4, which work to ensure inclusive and equitable quality education and lifelong learning for all by 2030. The Strategic Plan for 2021-2027 was developed against the backdrop of the COVID-19 pandemic. In this Plan, COL has reinvigorated its mandate to provide access to learning opportunities to those in need, making use of distance education and technologies. The 2021-2027 Strategic Plan also re-animates COL's various roles as enabler, capacity builder and catalyst for educational development.

COL hosts a triennial Pan-Commonwealth Forum (PCF) on Open Learning where its Excellence in Distance Education Awards (EDEA) are presented. The Tenth Pan-Commonwealth Forum (PCF10), co-hosted with Athabasca University – Canada's Online University, was held 14–16 September 2022 at the TELUS Convention Centre in Calgary, Canada. This first-ever hybrid Forum brought together nearly 500 policymakers, practitioners and thought leaders from 53 countries (42 Commonwealth countries) and boasted a gathering of more Ministers from more Commonwealth nations than ever before. The resulting Calgary Communique proposed to significantly accelerate progress towards the aim and targets of the SDGs in general and SDG4 in particular to innovate for more resilient education systems and address climate change challenges by prioritising collective actions. PCF11 is scheduled for fall 2025 in Gaborone, Botswana, in partnership with Botswana Open University.

== Funding ==
Financial support for COL's core operations is provided by Commonwealth governments on a voluntary basis, with primary funding renewed every three years. COL also receives additional contributions from other development sources and provides fee-for-service distance education and open learning course delivery and training for various international agencies.

COL's major financial contributors include Australia, Canada, India, New Zealand, Nigeria, South Africa and the United Kingdom, all of which have representatives on COL's Board of Governors.

== Initiatives ==
Virtual University for Small States of the Commonwealth (VUSSC) is a network of small countries that work collaboratively to expand access to and improve the quality of post-secondary education in their countries. Commonwealth Online Learning University (col.university) is an online learning university working collaboratively with the universities in the Commonwealth.
