= FlexBook =

Textbook authoring platform developed by the CK-12 Foundation

FlexBook is a textbook authoring platform developed by the CK-12 Foundation launched in 2008, focused on textbooks for the K-12 market. Derived from the words "flexibility" and "textbook," a FlexBook allows users to produce and customize content by re-purposing educational content using different modules. FlexBooks can be designed to suit a learner's learning style, region, language, or level of skill, while adhering to the local education standards.

== Features ==
FlexBooks are designed to overcome some of the limitations of traditional textbooks. Anyone – including teachers, students, and parents – can adapt, create, and configure a FlexBook.

Some FlexBooks features include:

- Web-based collaborative model, where the user can create and edit content to produce a custom textbook
- Open Educational Resource(OER) which allows for remixing of content
- Available in PDF, HTML, ePub (for iPad) and AZW (for Kindle)

== Licensing ==
Each CK-12 FlexBook is created under Creative Commons Attribution-Non-Commercial 3.0 Unported (CC BY-NC 3.0) License, giving its author/user a right to share (i.e., right to copy, distribute and transmit the work) a right to remix (i.e., right to adapt the work). However, conditions of Attribution and Non-commercial apply.

== Examples of use and collaboration ==
In March 2009, FlexBook was acknowledged as “an adaptive, web-based set of instructional materials” by Virginia officials when members from Virginia's K-12 physics community along with university and industry volunteers developed an eleven chapter FlexBook titled “21st Century Physics FlexBook: A Compilation of Contemporary and Modern Technologies” in just 4 months. In September 2010, NASA teamed up with CK-12 to add a chapter on “modeling and simulation” to the existing Physics FlexBook created earlier. In November 2011, teachers from a school district, Anoka-Hennepin, Minnesota, reportedly, saved the district $175,000 by writing their own online textbook instead of buying $65 textbooks – earlier, costing the district to the tune of $200,000. Wolfram has teamed up with CK-12 to produce interactive FlexBooks with Wolfram demonstrations embedded into the FlexBooks.

== See also ==
- OpenCourseWare
- Open educational resources
- Open textbook
- Bookboon
- China Open Resources for Education
- Connexions
- Curriki
- Flat World Knowledge
- Free High School Science Texts South Africa
- Khan Academy
- MIT OpenCourseWare
- National Programme on Technology Enhanced Learning India
- Open.Michigan
- Tufts OpenCourseWare
