= Open.Michigan =

Open access initiative

Open.Michigan is a collection of open initiatives and projects at the University of Michigan (U-M). Open.Michigan supports the open access and use of U-M resources for teaching, learning, and research. Open.Michigan promotes open content licensing and supports the reuse, redistribution, and remixing of educational materials for use by others worldwide. Some of the key efforts underway under the Open.Michigan umbrella include U-M's Open Educational Resources publishing activities, development of software tools that support creating open content, and various open content repositories.

== Open Educational Resources ==
A major component of Open.Michigan is the Open Educational Resources (OER) initiative, which supports and promotes the creation of OER and publishes those resources on U-M's OER website. Current participants include the Medical School, School of Information, School of Dentistry, College of Engineering, Gerald R. Ford School of Public Policy, School of Nursing, School of Public Health, School of Education, and College of Literature, Science and the Arts.

== Health OER ==
In fall 2007, the University of Michigan Medical School committed to publishing all pre-clinical curriculum materials as OER and worked with the School of Information to develop the dScribe publishing process. In 2008, a planning grant award from the William and Flora Hewlett Foundation supported U-M's work to hold a workshop in Ghana and develop a proof-of-concept effort for converting health education materials to OER. In 2009, U-M, OER Africa, and four African universities received a follow-on grant from Hewlett to build on this work and develop an OER program to support health education.

== dScribe ==
To facilitate the creation of OER, Open.Michigan developed a process called dScribe. This process uses students, acting as dScribes, and faculty working together to gather, review, and publish learning materials. The dScribe model uses a suite of software tools to manage the process of gathering, vetting, and publishing course material. The process begins with CTools, the University of Michigan's implementation of the Sakai CLE (Collaboration and Learning Environment). dScribes export the course materials from CTools, and then upload those materials to OERca which automatically scans the materials for any content objects (images). OERca also serves as a processing tool for managing content copyright status and tracking student-faculty interactions. The content is then deposited into Open.Michigan's instance of eduCommons, an open source OER publishing platform.

== See also ==
- OpenCourseWare
- Open educational resources
- Open textbook
- Bookboon
- China Open Resources for Education
- Connexions
- Curriki
- Flat World Knowledge
- Flexbook
- Free High School Science Texts South Africa
- Khan Academy
- MIT OpenCourseWare
- National Programme on Technology Enhanced Learning India
- Tufts OpenCourseWare
