= Free High School Science Texts =

South African non-profit organisation

The Free High School Science Texts (FHSST) organization is a South African non-profit project, which creates open textbooks on scientific subjects. Textbooks are edited to follow the government's syllabus, and published under a Creative Commons license (CC BY), allowing teachers and students to print them or share them digitally.

== History ==
FHSST was conceived in 2002 by Mark Horner, a physicist, when some rural South African children asked him to proofread notes that they had taken on a talk he gave on wave phenomena. The children intended to take the notes back to their schoolmates to use as a textbook on the subject.

== Subjects ==
FHSST has released books for grades 10-12 on physics, chemistry and mathematics. They are developing books in life sciences and computer literacy and a guide to teach students how to study.

== See also ==
- OpenCourseWare
- Open educational resources
- Open textbook
- Bookboon
- China Open Resources for Education
- Connexions
- Curriki
- Flat World Knowledge
- Flexbook
- Khan Academy
- MIT OpenCourseWare
- National Programme on Technology Enhanced Learning India
- Open.Michigan
- Tufts OpenCourseWare
