= Digital textbook =

Textbook in digital format

A digital textbook is a digital book or e-book intended to serve as the text for a class. Digital textbooks may also be known as e-textbooks or e-texts. Digital textbooks are a major component of technology-based education reform. They may serve as the texts for a traditional face-to-face class, an online course or degree, or massive open online courses (MOOCs). As with physical textbooks, digital textbooks can be either rented for a term or purchased for lifetime access. While accessible, digital textbooks can be downloaded, printed, or accessed online via a compatible device. To access content online, users must often use a 3rd party hosting provider or "digital bookshelf" through which digital textbooks can be served.

== Implementation ==
There are many potential advantages to digital textbooks. They may offer lower costs, make it easier to monitor student progress, and are easier and cheaper to update when needed. Open source e-textbooks may offer the opportunity to create free, modifiable textbooks for basic subjects, or give individual teachers the opportunity to create e-texts for their own classrooms. They may offer better access to quality texts in the developing world. For this reason, many schools and colleges around the world have made the implementation of digital textbooks a central component of education policy. For example, in South Korea, reading materials in all public schools will be digitized by 2015. In the United States, the Federal Communications Commission aims for every student to be able to access e-texts by 2017.

However, the transition to e-textbooks is costly, complex and controversial. Students express a strong preference for printed materials in many surveys and across cultures. Many interconnected factors, from device access, to digital literacy, to teaching methods affect the implementation of digital textbooks in the classroom. Issues of overall value, book quality, privacy, and intellectual property have yet to be resolved. An early 2009 study by Cleantech Group LLC also found that the emissions used to create an eBook were equivalent to 22.5 physical books, representing a significant improvement in environmental sustainability. As of 2021, the largest supplier of digital textbooks is VitalSource, with over 1 million titles in its catalog.

== Interactivity ==
A major selling point of digital textbooks is that they offer the opportunity for students to access multimedia content, such as embedded videos, interactive presentations and hyperlinks. Tests and other assessments can be included in the textbook, classmates can work together, and student progress can be tracked. Touchscreen technology offers students the chance to participate in projects, research or experiments. This may offer a different or better learning experience than printed textbooks. Digitization also promises to offer improved access to textbooks for students with disabilities.

== Open vs. closed ==
The concepts of open access and open source support the idea of open textbooks, digital textbooks that are free (gratis) and easy to distribute, modify and update (libre). Schools, teachers or professors may design their own open textbooks by gathering open access scholarly articles or other open access resources into one text or one curriculum. Open textbooks offer affordable access, especially to basic and common information, and pose a challenge to traditional models of textbook publishing. Modifiable or community edited textbooks may also be difficult to establish as credible or scholarly sources.

Other models for digital textbook publishing are more traditional. Textbook publishers may offer digital textbooks or digital curriculums that are standardized across classrooms, easier to update, and compliant with national standards, teaching methods or goals. This approach also offers pitfalls. License or renewal fees for digital textbooks may impose unexpected costs for institutions. For example, in 2013, the LA Unified School District announced that it would face an additional $60 million to license the curriculum for its one-to-one iPad program.

== Outcomes ==
Though many governments and school districts are making large investments in digital textbooks, adoption is slow. According to data from Bowker Market Research, in the spring semester of 2013, only 3% of college students used a digital textbook as their primary course material. In multiple studies, strong majorities of college students, teens, and children continue to express a preference for printed books. Furthermore, there is conflicting information about how digital textbooks affect learning, cognition and retention. However, students are growing more exposed to digital textbooks, and early research suggests that student performance is about the same whether students work from digital or printed texts.

== Digital textbooks ==
- FlexBook
- LibreTexts
- OpenStax
- Wikibooks
- WikiToLearn

== See also ==
- E-book
- Bookless library
- Information commons
- Information and communications technology
- Gratis vs. libre
