= OpenStax CNX =

Online repository of educational content

Connexions (1999-April 2014) OpenStax CNX (April 2014-)
- Website type: Open Educational Resources
- Available in: 34 languages
- Dissolved: December 21, 2022; 3 years ago
- Owner: Rice University
- Revenue: Foundation-funded non-profit
- Commercial: no
- Registration: free
- Launched: 1999; 27 years ago
- Current status: Discontinued
- Content license: Creative Commons Attribution 4.0

Connexions, later known as OpenStax CNX was a global repository of educational content provided by volunteers. The open source platform was provided and maintained by OpenStax, which is based at Rice University. The collection was available free of charge, can be remixed and edited, and was available for download in various digital formats.

Founded in 1999 by Richard Baraniuk, Connexions was based on the philosophy that scholarly and educational content can and should be shared, re-used and recombined, interconnected and continually enriched. As such, it was one of the first Open Educational Resources (OER) initiatives along with projects such as MIT OpenCourseWare and the Public Library of Science. The materials in Connexions are available under a CC BY Creative Commons license, which means that content can be used, adapted, and remixed, as long as attribution is provided. In June 2020, the CNX platform was retired. Its contents remain available on the Wayback Machine.

== Subject matter ==
Connexions contained educational materials at all levels—from children to college students to professionals—organized in small modules (pages) that can be connected into larger collections (books). Material was authored by people from all walks of life. Much content is created by university professors, but the collection also contained very popular music content created by a part-time music teacher.

Connexions material was translated into many languages, aided by the open-content licensing.

== Copyright ==
To ensure the legal reusability of content, Connexions required authors to license materials they publish under the Creative Commons Attribution License (presently, version 4.0). Under this license, the author retains the right to be credited (attributed) wherever the content is reused. The author grants others the right to copy, distribute, and display the work, and to derive works based on it, as long as the author is credited.

== Features ==
- Connexions had content from all over the world in a growing variety of languages, not just materials from one specific school or university. It also collects materials to support education in K-12, community college, university, continuing education, and industrial training settings.
- Connexions was globally accessible to anyone to not only read and use the materials, but also take them, customize them, and contribute them back to the repository or not.
- Connexions was grassroots organized from the bottom up rather than from the top down like many other open education projects. Everyone is free to join and take on a leadership role.

== Technical details ==
Three key factors enable the collaborative environment in Connexions:

- Copyright licenses that preserve attribution but permit sharing: Creative Commons "attribution" licenses
- Semantic markup of documents using XML (extensible markup language) so they can be searched for and combined. The markup language used is called "CNXML".
- Workspaces that facilitate collaboration by providing shared space, the ability to version materials and derive content from existing modules.

== Funding ==
The Connexions project was started in 1999 and initially supported by individuals and Rice University. That support has been substantially supplemented by grants from the William and Flora Hewlett Foundation.

== See also ==
- OpenStax, a library of free, peer-reviewed, and openly licensed college textbooks
- Creative Commons, the organization that created the licenses used by OpenStax CNX
- Open educational resources, the idea that educational resources can be shared in general through copyleft or other free culture movement licenses
- OpenCourseWare
- Open textbook
- Bookboon
- Curriki
- Flat World Knowledge
- Flexbook
- Khan Academy
- MIT OpenCourseWare
- Open.Michigan
