= OpenCourseWare =

University courses published for free online

OpenCourseWare (OCW) are course lessons created at universities and published for free via the Internet. OCW projects first appeared in the late 1990s, and after gaining traction in Europe and then the United States have become a worldwide means of delivering educational content.

== History ==
The OpenCourseWare movement started in 1999 when the University of Tübingen in Germany published videos of lectures online for its timms initiative (Tübinger Internet Multimedia Server). The OCW movement only took off with the launch of MIT OpenCourseWare at the Massachusetts Institute of Technology (MIT) and the Open Learning Initiative at Carnegie Mellon University in October 2002. The movement was reinforced by the launch of similar projects at Yale, Utah State University, the University of Michigan, and the University of California, Berkeley.

MIT's reasoning behind OCW was to "enhance human learning worldwide by the availability of a web of knowledge". MIT also stated that it would allow students (including, but not limited to, its own) to become better prepared for classes so that they may be more engaged during a class. Since then, a number of universities have created OCW, some of which have been funded by the William and Flora Hewlett Foundation.

== Principles ==
According to the website of the OCW Consortium, an OCW project:

- is a free and open digital publication of high quality educational materials, organized as courses.
- is available for use and adaptation under an open license, such as certain Creative Commons licenses.
- does not typically provide certification or access to faculty.

== edX ==
Ten years after the US debut of OCW, in 2012 MIT and Harvard University announced the formation of edX, a massive open online course (MOOC) platform to offer online university-level courses in a wide range of disciplines to a worldwide audience at no charge. This new initiative was based on MIT's "MITx" project, announced in 2011, and extends the concepts of OCW by offering more structured formal courses to online students, including in some cases the possibility of earning academic credit or certificates based on supervised examinations. A major new feature of the edX platform is the ability for students to interact with each other and with teachers in online forums. In some cases, students will help evaluate each other's work, and may even participate in some of the teaching online.

In addition, edX is being used as an experimental research platform to support and evaluate a variety of other new concepts in online learning.

== Problems ==
A problem is that the creation and maintenance of comprehensive OCW requires substantial initial and ongoing investments of human labor. Effective translation into other languages and cultural contexts requires even more investment by knowledgeable personnel. This is one of the reasons why English is still the dominant language, and fewer open courseware options are available in other languages. The OCW platform SlideWiki addresses these issues through a crowdsourcing approach.

== Africa ==
=== OER Africa ===
OER Africa has various OCW offerings available:

- The Advanced Certificate in Education (ACE) Mathematics to assist teachers in their understanding upper primary and middle school maths as well as teaching issues relating to mathematical content
- The ACE School Leadership and Management aimed at empowering school leaders to lead and manage schools effectively
- The Household Food Security Programme aims to train household food security facilitators to work as change agents in the areas of agriculture, food and nutrition, focusing on households within communities
- The Partnership for Enhanced and Blended Learning (PEBL) assists university partners across East Africa to develop courses that can be offered by participant universities through blended learning
- The Agshare II project, a collaboration between three HEIs in Ethiopia and Uganda on agricultural issues, lists a number of courseware documents under the list of Resources, while Communication Skills courseware developed by the University of Malawi is available at the IADP-SADC Digital Resources Project

== Americas ==
=== Colombia ===
- Universidad Icesi, OpenCourseWare de la Universidad Icesi

=== Brazil ===
- Fundação Getulio Vargas (FGV Online)
- Universidade Estadual de Campinas

=== Mexico ===
- Universidad de Monterrey, 2007
- Universidad Anáhuac México Norte, 2010

=== United States ===
This listing is roughly in the order of adoption of OCW principles.

- Massachusetts Institute of Technology (MIT), 2002
- Carnegie Mellon University, 2002
- University of California, Berkeley
- Stanford University
- Princeton University
- University of Pennsylvania
- University of Michigan
- Harvard University
- Yale University
- Caltech
- Johns Hopkins University
- University of California, Irvine

The following are not directly affiliated with a specific university:

- Academic Earth – privately owned
- Coursetexts – non-profit
- Khan Academy – non-profit
- Students Circle Network – peer to peer
- Coursera – venture capital financed
- Udacity – venture capital financed
- edX – acquired by 2U
- iversity – mixed (free and paid)

== Asia ==
=== China ===
OpenCourseWare, originally initiated by MIT and the Hewlett Foundation, came to China in September 2003, when MIT and the Internet Engineering Task Force (IETF) joined together with Beijing Jiaotong University to organize an OpenCourseWare conference in Beijing. As a result of this conference, 12 universities petitioned the government to institute a program of OpenCourseWare in China. This group included some of the most prestigious universities in China, as well as the Central Radio and Television University, which is China's central open university, with more than 2 million students.

As a result of this petition, the Chinese government instituted the CORE (China Open Resources for Education) to promote OpenCourseWare in Chinese Universities, with Fun-Den Wang (the head of IETF) as chairman. The CORE is an NGO supported by the Hewlett Foundation, IETF and other foundations. According to CORE's website, it has nearly 100 Chinese universities as members, including the most prestigious universities in China, such as Tsinghua University, Peking University and Shanghai Jiaotong University. This organization organized volunteers to translate foreign OpenCourseWare, mainly MIT OpenCourseWare into Chinese and to promote the application of OpenCourseWare in Chinese universities. In February 2008, 347 courses had been translated into Chinese and 245 of them were used by 200 professors in courses involving a total of 8,000 students. It also tried to translate some Chinese courses into English, but the number is not too much and some are only title translated. There have also been produced 148 comparative studies comparing MIT curriculum with Chinese curriculum using the MIT OpenCourseWare material. CORE's offices are hosted within the China Central Radio and Television University, and they receive partial funding from the IETF and the Hewlett Foundation. They also host annual conferences on open education, and the 2008 conference was co-located with the international OpenCourseWare Consortium conference, which brought a large amount of foreign participants. The website has been offline since 2013.

But before the OpenCourseWare conference in Beijing and the establishment of CORE, on April 8, 2003, the Ministry of Education had published a policy to launch the China Quality Course (精品课程) program. This program accepts applications for university lecturers that wish to put their courses online, and gives grants of between $10,000 – 15,000 CAD per course that is put online, and made available free of charge to the general public (ibid.). The most prestigious award is for the "national level CQOCW", then there is "provincial level" and "school level". From 2003 to 2010, they produced 3862 courses at the national level by 746 universities. According to the official website for the China Quality Course, the total number of the courses available online is more than 20,000. These typically include syllabus, course notes, overheads, assignments, and in many cases audio or video of the entire lectures. The scale of this project has also spurred a large research activity, and over 3,000 journal articles have been written in Chinese about the topic of OpenCourseWare.

The UNESCO Institute for Information Technologies in Education (IITE) has been promoting Open Educational Resources (OER) in China.

Cul-studies.com provides culture studies and teaching in China under a Creative Commons license run by Contemporary Culture Studies (CCCS) of the Shanghai University.

==== China Quality Course ====
China Quality Course is a program launched by the Ministry of Education of the People's Republic of China since April 8, 2003. The website allows for ranking of courses. From 2003 to 2010, 3862 courses had been produced at the national level by 746 universities. According to the official website for the China Quality Course, the total number of courses available online is more than 20,000. It lists no license or copyright on the website.

=== Malaysia ===
University of Malaya (UM) is the foremost and premier Research University (RU) in Malaysia. It is a multidisciplinary RU that has more than 27,000 students and 1700 academic staff with 17 faculties and research centres that covers the whole spectrum of learning from the Arts, Sciences and Humanities. The university's beginning at the Kuala Lumpur campus dates back to 1959 and has graduated over 100,000 people, including leaders in various fields.

=== Pakistan ===
The Virtual University (Urdu: ورچوئل یونیورسٹی; Vu), is a public university located in urban area of Lahore, Punjab, Pakistan. Its additional campus is also located in residential area of Karachi, Sindh, Pakistan.

Established in 2002 by the Government of Pakistan to promote distance education in modern information and communication sciences as its primary objectives, the university is noted for its online lectures and broadcasting rigorous programs regardless of their students' physical locations. The university offers undergraduate and post-graduate courses in business administration, economics, computer science, and information technology. Due to its heavy reliance on serving lectures through the internet, Pakistani students residing overseas in several other countries of the region are also enrolled in the university's programs.

=== India ===
The National Programme on Technology Enhanced Learning (NPTEL) is a Government of India sponsored collaborative educational program. By developing curriculum-based video and web courses, the program aims to enhance the quality of engineering education in India. It is being jointly carried out by 7 IITs and IISc, Bangalore and is funded by the Ministry of Education (previously Ministry of Human Resource Development) of the Government of India.

Flexilearn is an open course portal. It was initiated by Indira Gandhi National Open University, and apart from providing free course materials, allows students to appear for the requisite exam conducted by the university and receive certification.

All previously operational local chapters are now collectively offering courses under SWAYAM (Study Webs of Active-Learning for Young Aspiring Minds). This is done through a platform that facilitates hosting of all the courses, taught in classrooms from Class 9 till post-graduation. All the courses are interactive and free of cost to any learner. Nine national co-coordinators are appointed, which also includes NPTEL, i.e., course work by Indian engineering institutes headed by IIT Madras. The courses hosted on SWAYAM are in four quadrants – video lecture, specially prepared reading material that can be downloaded and/ or printed, self-assessment tests through tests and quizzes and an online discussion forum.

=== Japan ===
OpenCourseWare was introduced and adopted in Japan.

In 2002, researchers from the National Institute of Multimedia Education (NIME) and Tokyo Institute of Technology (Tokyo Tech) studied the MIT OpenCourseWare, leading them to develop an OCW pilot plan with 50 courses at Tokyo Institute of Technology in September. Later, in July 2004, MIT gave a lecture about MIT OpenCourseWare at Tokyo Tech that prompted the first meeting of the Japan OCW Alliance. The meeting was held with four Japanese universities that had mainly been recruited through the efforts of MIT professor Miyagawa, and his personal contacts. In one case, the connection was the former president of the University of Tokyo being an acquaintance of Charles Vest, the former president of MIT.

In 2006, the OCW International Conference was held at Kyoto University wherein the Japanese OCW Association was reorganized into the Japan OCW Consortium. At that time, Japan OCW Consortium had over 600 courses; currently they have 18 university members, including the United Nations University (JOCW, n.d.). On Japanese university campuses there are few experts in content production, which makes it difficult to get support locally, and many of the universities have had to outsource their production of OCW. In example, the University of Tokyo has had to mainly employ students to create OCW.

The motivation for joining the OCW movement seems to be to create positive change among Japanese universities, including modernizing presentation style among lecturers, as well as sharing learning material. Japanese researchers have been particularly interested in the technical aspects of OCW, for example in creating semantic search engines. There is currently a growing interest for Open Educational Resources (OER) among Japanese universities, and more universities are expected to join the consortium.

"In order to become an integral institution that contributes to OER, the JOCW Consortium needs to forge solidarity among the member universities and build a rational for OER on its own, different from that of MIT, which would support the international deployment of Japanese universities and also Japanese style e-Learning."

=== Iran ===
The "Maktabkhooneh (Persian: مکتب خونه)" is an online educational platform in Iran which provides free online courses from universities in Iran. The motto of the Maktab-Khooneh is "Making Accessible Excellent High Quality Education For Every Iranian for Free". Maktabkhooneh partners with Iran's top universities, mostly Sharif University of Technology, University of Tehran, Amirkabir University of Technology, Tehran University of Medical Sciences and so on. There is more than 200 courses available on Maktabkhooneh for free.

The "ocw.um.ac.ir (Persian: سامانه فیلم های آموزشی دانشگاه فردوسی مشهد)" is an online educational platform in Iran which provides free online courses from Ferdowsi University of Mashhad in Iran. The motto of the ocw.um.ac.ir is "Making Accessible Excellent High Quality Education For Every Iranian for Free". ocw.um.ac.ir partners with Iran's top professors of Ferdowsi University of Mashhad and so on. There is more than 200 courses available on ocw.um.ac.ir for free.

=== Israel ===
The Open University of Israel has been a member through its Pe'er initiative since 2008.

=== Taiwan ===
Led by the National Chiao Tung University, Taiwan started organizing several open course plans, the main organization is named Taiwan open course and education consortium (Chinese: 台灣開放式課程暨教育聯盟). The plan attracted the National Taiwan University, National Chengchi University, National Taiwan Normal University, and others into the development of project.

=== United Arab Emirates ===
In the United Arab Emirates, a discussion, led by Dr. Linzi J. Kemp, American University of Sharjah, has begun about sharing teaching and learning materials (‘open course ware’) through a community of educators and practitioners in the GCC. There is growing availability of high quality and free open access materials shared between universities e.g. MIT (USA). Resource sharing also takes place on the ‘Open University (UK), OpenLearn’ platform. Kemp (2013) proposes that teaching and learning will be enhanced when teachers across institutions of higher education work together to bring their shared knowledge into classrooms. Furthermore, when the platform is opened up to include practitioners – e.g. employers – then the relationship with the industry will further ensure that the teaching and learning is available and beneficial for a wider community.

== Europe ==
=== Germany ===
- University of Tübingen, 1999
- SlideWiki.org (developed at University of Leipzig)

=== France ===
- France Université Numérique: The Mooc portal for French Universities, founded in 2013 with state support.

=== Netherlands ===
- Delft University of Technology, 2007

=== Romania ===
- Politehnica University of Bucharest, 2012

=== Turkey ===
- Middle East Technical University

=== United Kingdom ===
- OpenLearn, the free learning portal developed by The Open University, UK.

== See also ==
- Berkeley Webcast
- Notre Dame OpenCourseWare
- Open.Michigan
- Open Yale Courses
- Saylor Academy
- Tufts OpenCourseWare
