= MIT OpenCourseWare =

Web-based publication of MIT course content

- Website type: Free and open online learning
- Available in: English
- Founded: 2001
- Headquarters: Cambridge MA, USA
- Area served: Global
- Creator: Massachusetts Institute of Technology
- Industry: Education
- Products: Open education resources (OER)
- Subsidiaries: YouTube channel https://www.youtube.com/@mitocw
- Website: https://ocw.mit.edu
- Commercial: No
- Registration: None
- Users: Over 250 million users since launch
- Current status: Active
- Content license: Default Creative Commons BY-NC-SA

MIT OpenCourseWare (MIT OCW) is an initiative of the Massachusetts Institute of Technology (MIT) to publish "virtually all" of the educational materials from its undergraduate- and graduate-level courses online, freely and openly available to anyone, anywhere. The project was announced on April 4, 2001, and uses the Creative Commons Attribution-NonCommercial-ShareAlike license as its default. The program was originally funded by the William and Flora Hewlett Foundation, the Andrew W. Mellon Foundation, and MIT. MIT OpenCourseWare is supported by MIT, corporate underwriting, major gifts, and donations from site visitors. The initiative inspired a number of other institutions to make their course materials available as open educational resources.

As of October 2026, over 2,580 courses are available online. While a few of these courses are limited to chronological reading lists and discussion topics, a majority provided homework problems and exams (often with solutions) and lecture notes. Some courses also include complete textbooks written by MIT professors, examples of student work on assignments and projects, and video lectures. As of October 2026, 300 courses include video lectures. The videos are posted on the MIT OpenCourseWare YouTube channel and the Internet Archive, and downloadable from Internet Archive.

The MIT OpenCourseWare project sits within MIT Open Learning at the Massachusetts Institute of Technology.

== History ==
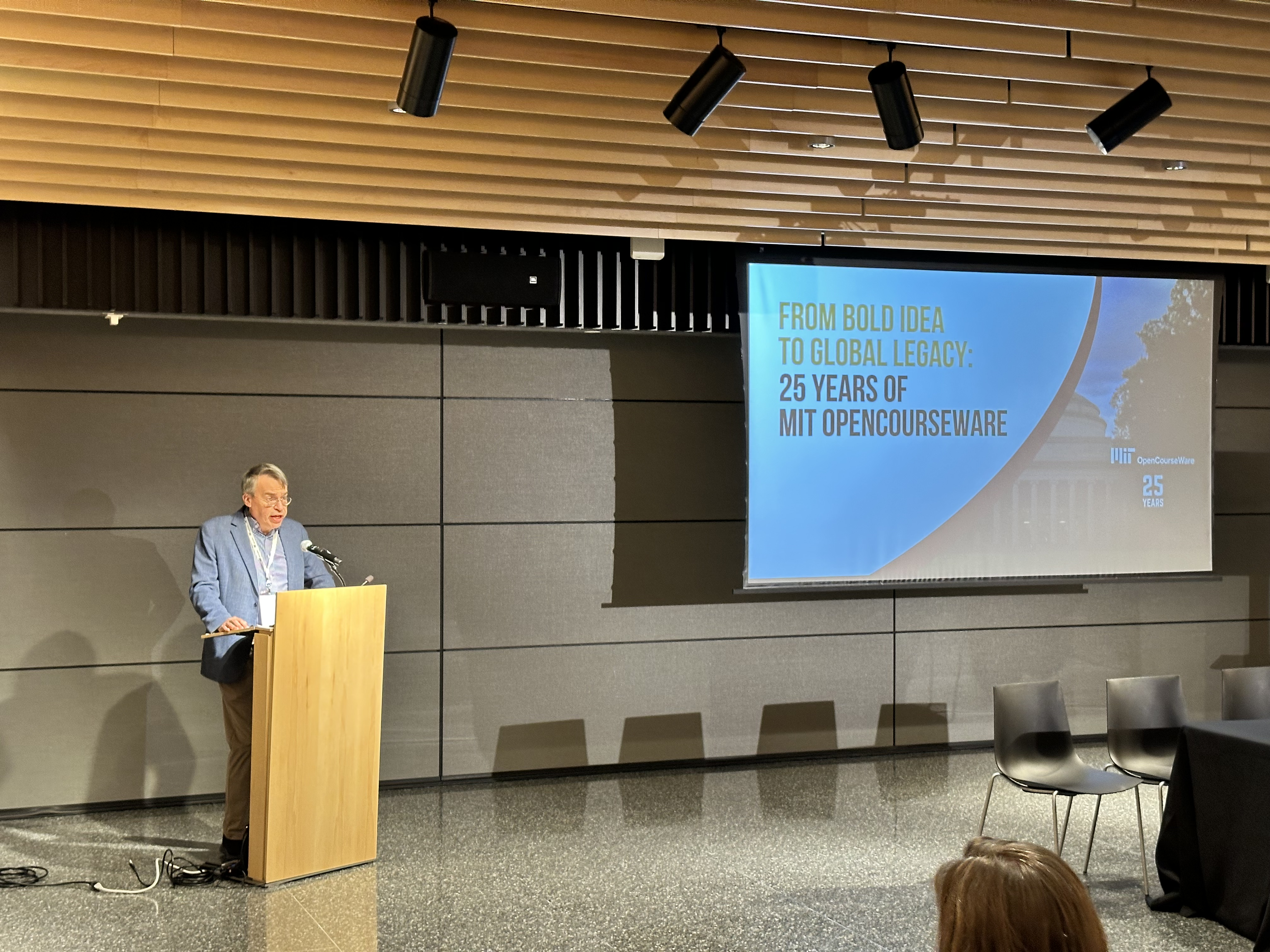
MIT OpenCourseWare 25th anniversary conference, April 8, 2026, Professor Dimitris Bertsimas, Vice Provost for Open Learning at MIT

In 1999, the concept of MIT OpenCourseWare grew out of the MIT Council on Education Technology, which was charged by MIT provost Robert Brown with determining how MIT should position itself in the distance learning/e-learning environment. MIT OpenCourseWare was then initiated to provide a new model for the dissemination of knowledge and collaboration among scholars around the world, and contributes to the “shared intellectual commons” in academia, which fosters collaboration across MIT and among other scholars. The project was spearheaded by professors Dick K.P Yue, Shigeru Miyagawa, and Hal Abelson.

The main challenge in implementing the MIT OCW initiative had not been faculty resistance, but rather, the logistical challenges presented by determining ownership and obtaining publication permission for the massive amount of copyrighted items that are embedded in the course materials of MIT's faculty, in addition to the time and technical effort required to convert the educational materials to an online format. Copyright in MIT OpenCourseWare material remains with MIT, and its faculty and student contributors.

In September 2002, the MIT OpenCourseWare proof-of-concept pilot site opened to the public, offering 32 courses. In September 2003, MIT OpenCourseWare published its 500th course. In November 2007, the publication reached 1,800 courses, realizing the program's original goal to share materials from “virtually the entire MIT curriculum.”

In 2005, MIT OpenCourseWare and other open educational resources projects formed the OpenCourseWare Consortium (now Open Education Global), in order to extend the reach and impact of open course materials, foster new open course materials and develop sustainable models for open course material publication.

In 2007, MIT OpenCourseWare introduced a site called Highlights for High School that indexed resources on the MIT OCW applicable to advanced high school study in biology, chemistry, calculus and physics, along with new materials created especially for these learners, in an effort to support US STEM education at the secondary school level. The Highlights for High School site was taken down in April 2022, with some of the original materials created for this program such as the "Chem Lab Boot Camp" video series migrating to the main OCW site.

In 2011, MIT OpenCourseWare introduced the first of fifteen OCW Scholar courses, which are designed specifically for the needs of independent learners. While still publications of course materials like the rest of the site content, these courses are more in-depth and the materials are presented in logical sequences that facilitate self-study. No interaction with other students is supported by the OCW site, but study groups on collaborating project OpenStudy are available for some OCW Scholar courses.

In 2012, Harvard and MIT launched edX, a massive open online course (MOOC) provider to deliver online learning opportunities to the public. Between 2013 and 2019, some MIT OCW courses were delivered by the European MOOC platform Eliademy.

In recent years, MIT OCW has expanded its reach and features. As of 2020, the platform reported an increase in global engagement, with materials accessed by over 500 million learners worldwide since its inception.

== Technology ==
MIT OCW was originally served by a custom content management system based on Microsoft's Content Management Server, which was replaced in mid-2010 with a Plone-based content management system. The publishing process is described by MIT as a "large-scale digital publishing infrastructure" that consists of planning tools, a content management system (CMS), and the MIT OpenCourseWare content distribution infrastructure. Video content for the courses was originally primarily in RealMedia format.

In 2008, OCW transitioned to using YouTube as the primary digital video streaming platform for the site, embedding YouTube video back into the OCW site. OCW video and audio files are also provided in full for offline downloads on iTunesU and the Internet Archive. In 2011, OCW introduced an iPhone app called LectureHall in partnership with Irynsoft.

Additional technology for video processing and course publishing is provided by MIT SOUL.

== Funding ==
In 2011, "MIT's goal for the next decade [was] to increase our reach ten-fold" and to secure funding for this.

As of 2013, the annual cost of running MIT OCW was about US$3.5 million (equivalent to $4.8 million in 2025).

== See also ==
- Bookboon
- OpenStax CNX, by Rice University
- Curriki
- Fathom.com
- Flat World Knowledge
- Flexbook
- Free High School Science Texts South Africa
- National Programme on Technology Enhanced Learning (NPTEL), India
- Open.Michigan
- Open textbook
- Tufts OpenCourseWare
