= Textbook =

Type of academic study book

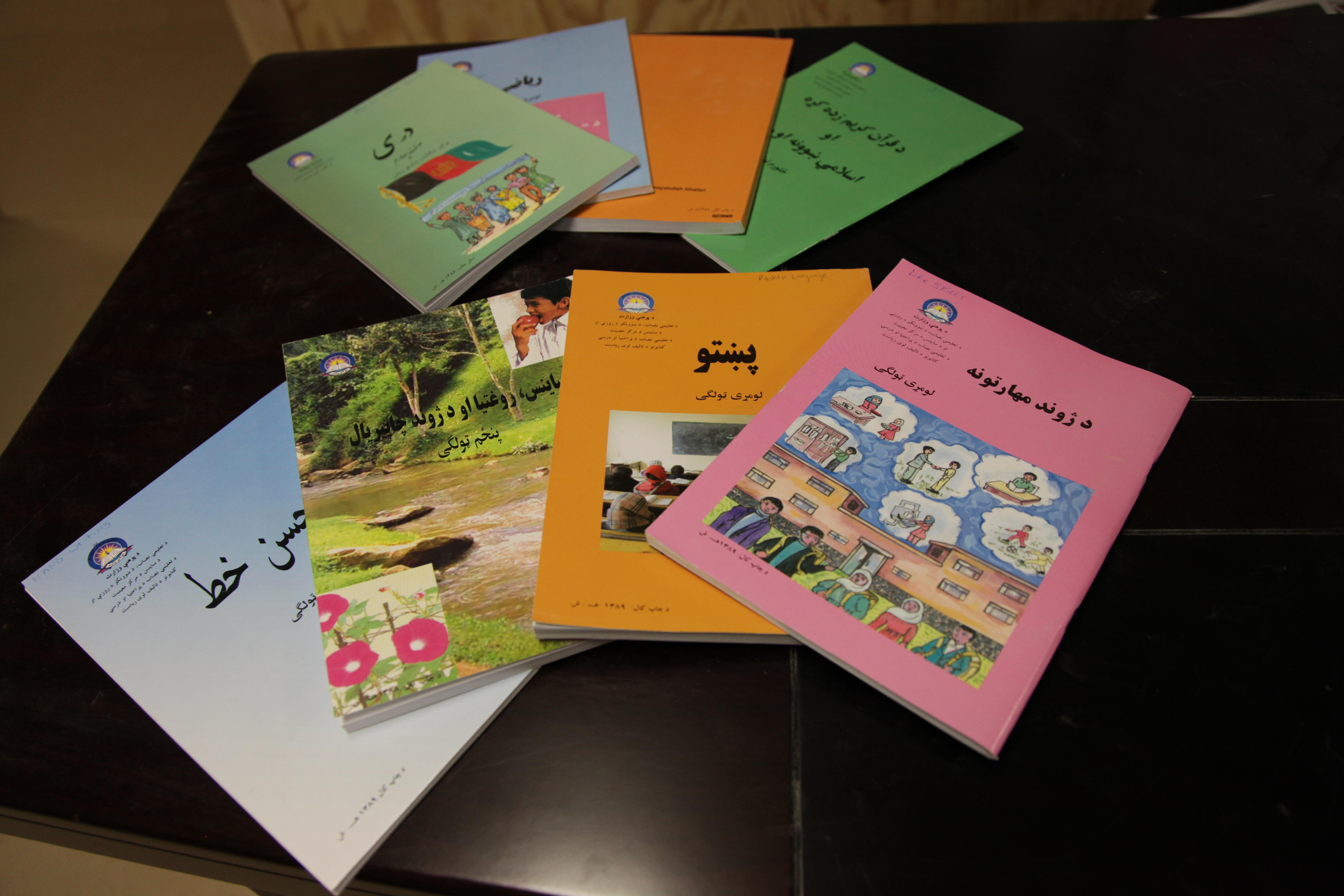
Textbooks written in Pashto distributed to Afghan school children

A textbook is a book containing a comprehensive compilation of content in a branch of study serving to explain the subject. Textbooks are produced to meet the needs of educators, usually at educational institutions, as well as learners (who could be independent learners outside of formal education). Schoolbooks are textbooks and other books used in schools. Today, many textbooks are published in both print and digital formats.

== History ==
=== Ancient civilizations ===
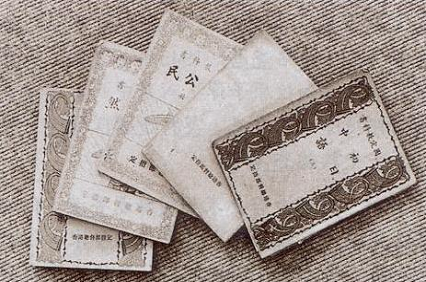
School textbooks used during the Japanese occupation of Hong Kong

The history of textbooks dates back to ancient civilizations. For example, Ancient Greeks wrote educational texts. The modern textbook has its roots in the mass production made possible by the printing press. Johannes Gutenberg himself may have printed editions of Ars Minor, a schoolbook on Latin grammar by Aelius Donatus. Early textbooks were used by tutors and teachers (e.g. alphabet books), as well as by individuals who taught themselves.

The Greek philosopher Socrates lamented the loss of knowledge because the media of transmission were changing. Before the invention of the Greek alphabet 2,500 years ago, knowledge and stories were recited aloud, much like Homer's epic poems. The new technology of writing meant stories no longer needed to be memorized, a development Socrates feared would weaken the Greeks' mental capacities for memorizing and retelling. (Ironically, we know about Socrates' concerns only because they were written down by his student Plato in his famous Dialogues.)

=== The printing press ===
The next revolution in the field of books came with the 15th-century invention of printing with changeable type. The invention is attributed to German metalsmith Johannes Gutenberg, who cast type in molds using a melted metal alloy and constructed a wooden-screw printing press to transfer the image onto paper.

Gutenberg's first and only large-scale printing effort was the now iconic Gutenberg Bible in the 1450s – a Latin translation from the Hebrew Old Testament and the Greek New Testament. Gutenberg's invention made mass production of texts possible for the first time. Although the Gutenberg Bible itself was expensive, printed books began to spread widely over European trade routes during the next 50 years, and by the 16th century, printed books had become more widely accessible and less costly.

Peter Ramus (Petrus Ramus) in 16th century France challenged the curriculum taught at university and published a textbook that could be used by anyone. It was a textbook with a structure of headings and summaries.

=== Modern era ===
While many textbooks were already in use, compulsory education and the resulting growth of schooling in Europe led to the printing of many more textbooks for children. Textbooks have been the primary teaching instrument for most children since the 19th century. Two textbooks of historical significance in United States schooling were the 18th century New England Primer and the 19th century McGuffey Readers.

Recent technological advances have changed the way people interact with textbooks. Online and digital materials are making it increasingly easy for students to access materials other than the traditional print textbook. Students now have access to electronic books ("e-books"), online tutoring systems and video lectures. An example of an e-book is Principles of Biology from Nature Publishing.

Most notably, an increasing number of authors are avoiding commercial publishers and instead offering their textbooks under a creative commons or other open license.

== Market ==
=== The market for textbooks ===
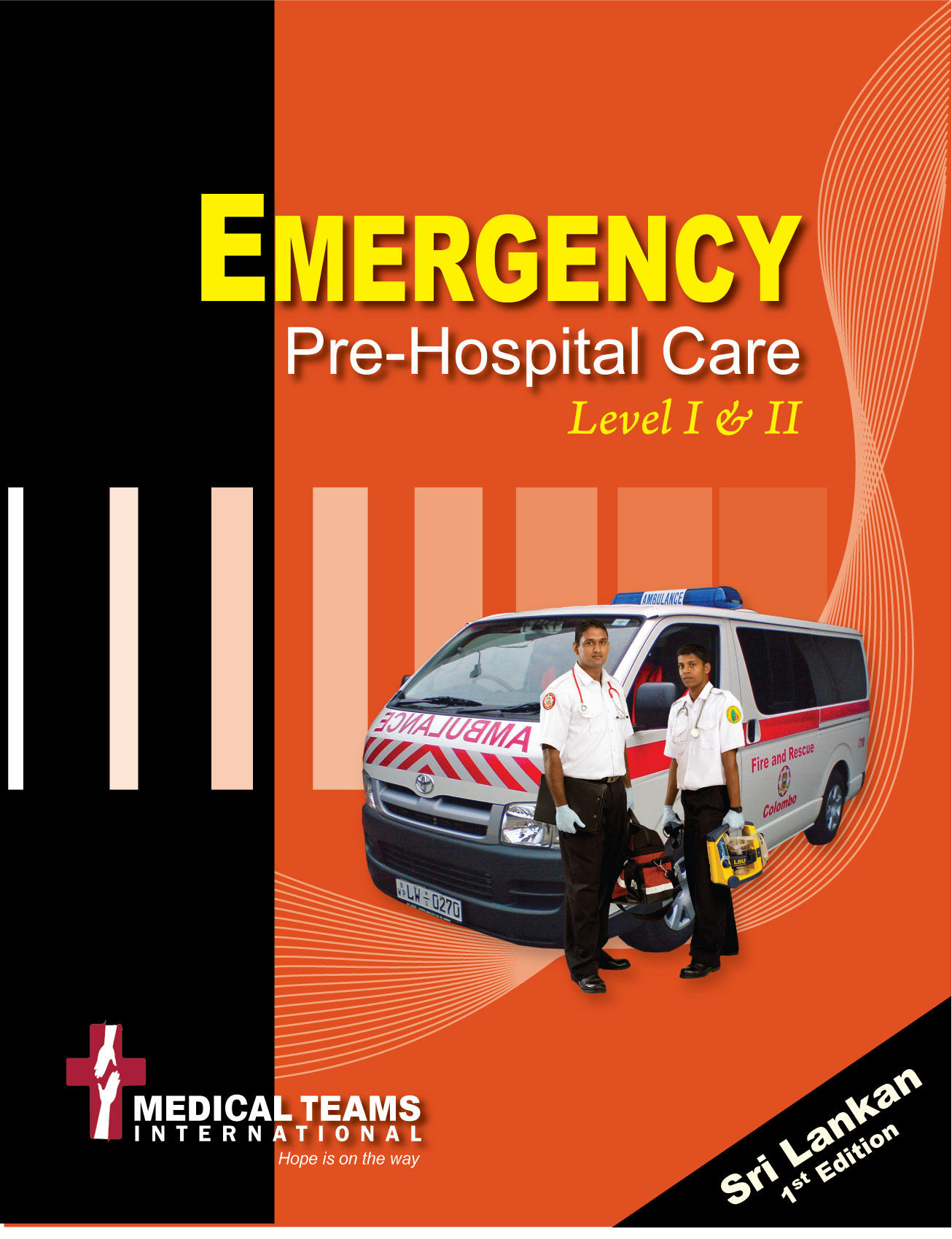
Sri Lanka emergency medical technician textbook

As in many industries, the number of providers has declined in recent years (there are just a handful of major textbook companies in the United States). Also, elasticity of demand is fairly low. The term "broken market" appeared in the economist James Koch's analysis of the market commissioned by the Advisory Committee on Student Financial Assistance.

In the United States, the largest textbook publishers are Pearson Education, Cengage, McGraw-Hill Education, and Wiley. Together they control 90% of market revenue. Another textbook publisher is Houghton Mifflin Harcourt.

The market for textbooks does not reflect classic supply and demand because of agency problems.

=== New editions and the used book market in the United States ===
Some students save money by buying used copies of textbooks, which tend to be less expensive, and are available from many college bookstores in the US, who buy them back from students at the end of a term. Books that are not being re-used at the school are often purchased by an off-campus wholesaler for 0–30% of the new cost, for distribution to other bookstores. Some textbook companies have countered this by encouraging teachers to assign homework that must be done on the publisher's website. Students with a new textbook can use the pass code in the book to register on the site; otherwise they must pay the publisher to access the website and complete assigned homework.

Students who look beyond the campus bookstore can typically find lower prices. With the ISBN or title, author and edition, most textbooks can be located through online used booksellers or retailers.

Most leading textbook companies publish a new edition every 3 or 4 years, more frequently in math and science. Harvard economics chair James K. Stock has stated that new editions are often not about significant improvements to the content. "New editions are to a considerable extent simply another tool used by publishers and textbook authors to maintain their revenue stream, that is, to keep up prices." A study conducted by The Student PIRGs found that a new edition costs 12% more than a new copy of the previous edition (not surprising if the old version is obsolete), and 58% more than a used copy of the previous edition. Textbook publishers maintain these new editions are driven by demand from teachers. That study found that 76% of teachers said new editions were justified "half of the time or less" and 40% said they were justified "rarely" or "never". The PIRG study has been criticized by publishers, who argue that the report contains factual inaccuracies regarding the annual average cost of textbooks per student.

The Student PIRGs also point out that recent emphasis on e-textbooks does not always save students money. Even though the book costs less up-front, the student will not recover any of the cost through resale.

=== Bundling in the United States ===
Another publishing industry practice that has been highly criticized is "bundling", or shrink-wrapping supplemental items into a textbook. Supplemental items range from CD-ROMs and workbooks to online passcodes and bonus material. Students often cannot buy these things separately, and often the one-time-use supplements destroy the resale value of the textbook.

According to the Student PIRGs, the typical bundled textbook costs 10%–50% more than an unbundled textbook, and 65% of professors said they "rarely" or "never" use the bundled items in their courses.

A 2005 Government Accountability Office (GAO) Report in the United States found that the production of these supplemental items was the primary cause of rapidly increasing prices:

While publishers, retailers, and wholesalers all play a role in textbook pricing, the primary factor contributing to increases in the price of textbooks has been the increased investment publishers have made in new products to enhance instruction and learning...While wholesalers, retailers, and others do not question the quality of these materials, they have expressed concern that the publishers' practice of packaging supplements with a textbook to sell as one unit limits the opportunity students have to purchase less expensive used books....If publishers continue to increase these investments, particularly in technology, the cost to produce a textbook is likely to continue to increase in the future.

Bundling has also been used to segment the used book market. Each combination of a textbook and supplemental items receives a separate ISBN. A single textbook could therefore have dozens of ISBNs that denote different combinations of supplements packaged with that particular book. When a bookstore attempts to track down used copies of textbooks, they will search for the ISBN the course instructor orders, which will locate only a subset of the copies of the textbook.

Legislation at state and federal levels seeks to limit the practice of bundling, by requiring publishers to offer all components separately. Publishers have testified in favor of bills including this provision, but only in the case that the provision exempts the loosely defined category of "integrated textbooks". The Federal bill only exempts 3rd party materials in integrated textbooks, however publisher lobbyists have attempted to create a loophole through this definition in state bills.

=== Price disclosure ===
Given that the problem of high textbook prices is linked to the "broken" economics of the market, requiring publishers to disclose textbook prices to faculty is a solution pursued by a number of legislatures. By inserting price into sales interactions, this regulation will supposedly make the economic forces operate more normally.

No data suggests that this is in fact true. However, The Student PIRGs have found that publishers actively withhold pricing information from faculty, making it difficult to obtain. Their most recent study found that 77% of faculty say publisher sales representatives do not volunteer prices, and only 40% got an answer when they directly asked. Furthermore, the study found that 23% of faculty rated publisher websites as "informative and easy to use" and less than half said they typically listed the price.

The US Congress passed a law in the 2008 Higher Education Opportunity Act that would require price disclosure. Legislation requiring price disclosure has passed in Connecticut, Washington, Minnesota, Oregon, Arizona, Oklahoma, and Colorado. Publishers are currently supporting price disclosure mandates, though they insist that the "suggested retail price" should be disclosed, rather than the actual price the publisher would get for the book.

=== Used textbook market ===
Once a textbook is purchased from a retailer for the first time, there are several ways a student can sell his/her textbooks back at the end of the semester or later. Students can sell to 1) the college/university bookstore; 2) fellow students; 3) numerous online websites; or 4) a student swap service.

==== Campus buyback ====
As for buyback on a specific campus, faculty decisions largely determine how much a student receives. If a professor chooses to use the same book the following semester, even if it is a custom text, designed specifically for an individual instructor, bookstores often buy the book back. The GAO report found that, generally, if a book is in good condition and will be used on the campus again the next term, bookstores will pay students 50 percent of the original price paid. If the bookstore has not received a faculty order for the book at the end of the term and the edition is still current, they may offer students the wholesale price of the book, which could range from 5 to 35 percent of the new retail price, according to the GAO report.

When students resell their textbooks during campus "buyback" periods, these textbooks are often sold into the national used textbook distribution chain. If a textbook is not going to be used on campus for the next semester of courses then many times the college bookstore will sell that book to a national used book company. The used book company then resells the book to another college bookstore. Finally, that book is sold as used to a student at another college at a price that is typically 75% of the new book price. At each step, a markup is applied to the book to enable the respective companies to continue to operate.

==== Student to student sales ====
Students can also sell or trade textbooks among themselves. After completing a course, sellers will often seek out members of the next enrolling class, people who are likely to be interested in purchasing the required books. This may be done by posting flyers to advertise the sale of the books or simply soliciting individuals who are shopping in the college bookstore for the same titles. Many larger schools have independent websites set up for the purpose of facilitating such trade. These often operate much like digital classified ads, enabling students to list their items for sale and browse for those they wish to acquire. Also, at the US Air Force Academy, it is possible to e-mail entire specific classes, allowing for an extensive network of textbook sales to exist.

==== Student online marketplaces ====
Online marketplaces are one of the two major types of online websites students can use to sell used textbooks. Online marketplaces may have an online auction format or may allow the student to list their books for a fixed price. In either case, the student must create the listing for each book themselves and wait for a buyer to order, making the use of marketplaces a more passive way of selling used textbooks. Unlike campus buyback and online book, students are unlikely to sell all their books to one buyer using online marketplaces, and will likely have to send out multiple books individually.

==== Online book buyers ====
Online book buyers buy textbooks, and sometimes other types of books, with the aim of reselling them for a profit. Like online marketplaces, online book buyers operate year-round, giving students the opportunity to sell their books even when campus "buyback" periods are not in effect. Online book buyers, who are often online book sellers as well, will sometimes disclaim whether or not a book can be sold back prior to purchase. Students enter the ISBN numbers of the books they wish to sell and receive a price quote or offer. These online book buyers often offer "free shipping" (which in actuality is built into the offer for the book), and allow students to sell multiple books to the same source. Because online book buyers are buying books for resale, the prices they offer may be lower than students can get on online marketplaces. However, their prices are competitive, and they tend to focus on the convenience of their service. Some even claim that buying used textbooks online and selling them to online book buyers has a lower total cost than even textbook rental services.

==== Textbook exchanges ====
In response to escalating textbook prices, limited competition, and to provide a more efficient system to connect buyers and sellers together, online textbook exchanges were developed. Most of today's sites handle buyer and seller payments, and usually deduct a small commission only after the sale is completed.

According to textbook author Henry L. Roediger (and Wadsworth Publishing Company senior editor Vicki Knight), the used textbook market is illegitimate, and entirely to blame for the rising costs of textbooks. As methods of "dealing with this problem", he recommends making previous editions of textbooks obsolete, binding the textbook with other materials, and passing laws to prevent the sale of used books. The concept is not unlike the limited licensing approach for computer software, which places rigid restrictions on resale and reproduction. The intent is to make users understand that the content of any textbook is the intellectual property of the author and/or the publisher, and that as such, subject to copyright. Obviously, this idea is completely opposed to the millennia-old tradition of the sale of used books, and would make that entire industry illegal.

==== E-textbooks ====
Another alternative to save money and obtaining the materials you are required are e-textbooks. The article "E books rewrite the rules of education" states that, alternately to spending a lot of money on textbooks, you can purchase an e-textbook at a small amount of the cost. With the growth of digital applications for iPhone, and gadgets like the Amazon kindle, e-textbooks are not an innovation, but have been "gaining momentum". According to the article "Are textbooks obsolete?", publishers and editorials are concerned about the issue of expensive textbooks. "The expense of textbooks is a concern for students, and e-textbooks, address the face of the issue", Williams says "As publishers we understand the high cost of these materials, and the electronic format permit us diminish the general expense of our content to the market". E-textbook applications facilitate similar experiences to physical textbooks by allowing the user to highlight and take notes in-page. These applications also extend textbook learning by providing quick definitions, reading the text aloud, and search functionality.

=== Rental programs ===
In-store rentals are processed by either using a kiosk and ordering books online with a third party facilitator or renting directly from the store's inventory. Some stores use a hybrid of both methods, opting for in-store selections of the most popular books and the online option for more obscure titles or books they consider too risky to put in the rental system. Rented items can be used for a set duration of time, then are required to be returned to the physical store or shipped back to the third party facilitator by the rental due date. Writing and highlighting is sometimes allowed in rented items, although excessive markup which makes the item unrentable is discouraged. Overdue items are often charged a fee up to the retail price of the rented item. Rented items typically do not include supplemental materials such as access codes, CDs, or loose-leafs.

=== Textbook sharing ===
Using textbook sharing, students share the physical textbook with other students, and the cost of the book is divided among the users of the textbook. Over the life of the textbook, if 4 students use the textbook, the cost of the textbook for each student will be 25% of the total cost of the book.

=== Open textbooks ===
The latest trend in textbooks is "open textbooks". An open textbook is a free, openly licensed textbook offered online by the copyright holders. According to PIRG, a number of textbooks already exist, and are being used at schools such as MIT and Harvard. A 2010 study published found that open textbooks offer a viable and attractive means to meet faculty and student needs while offering savings of approximately 80% compared to traditional textbook options.

Although the largest question seems to be who is going to pay to write them, several state policies suggest that public investment in open textbooks might make sense. To offer another perspective, any jurisdiction might find itself challenged to find sufficient numbers of credible academics who would be willing to undertake the effort of creating an open textbook without realistic compensation, to make such a proposal work. Currently, some open textbooks have been funded with non-profit investment.

The other challenge involves the reality of publishing, which is that textbooks with good sales and profitability subsidize the creation and publication of low demand but believed to be necessary textbooks. Subsidies skew markets and the elimination of subsidies is disruptive; in the case of low demand textbooks the possibilities following subsidy removal include any or all of the following: higher retail prices, a switch to open textbooks, a reduction of the number of titles published.

On the other hand, independent open textbook authoring and publishing models are developing. Most notably, the startup publisher Flat World Knowledge already has dozens of college-level open textbooks that are used by more than 900 institutions in 44 countries. Their business model was to offer the open textbook free online, and then sell ancillary products that students are likely to buy if prices are reasonable – print copies, study guides, ePub, .Mobi (Kindle), PDF download, etc. Flat World Knowledge compensates its authors with royalties on these sales. With the generated revenue Flat World Knowledge funded high-quality publishing activities with a goal of making the Flat World financial model sustainable. However, in January 2013 Flat World Knowledge announced their financial model could no longer sustain their free-to-read options for students. Flat World Knowledge intends to have open textbooks available for the 125 highest-enrolled courses on college campuses within the next few years.

CK-12 Flexbooks are the open textbooks designed for United States K-12 courses. CK-12 FlexBooks are designed to facilitate conformance to national and United States and individual state textbook standards. CK-12 FlexBooks are licensed under a Creative Commons BY-NC-SA license. CK-12 FlexBooks are free to use online and offer formats suitable for use on portable personal reading devices and computers – both online and offline. Formats for both iPad and Kindle are offered. School districts may select a title as is or customize the open textbook to meet local instructional standards. The file may be then accessed electronically or printed using any print on demand service without paying a royalty, saving 80% or more when compared to traditional textbook options. An example print on demand open textbook title, "College Algebra" by Stitz & Zeager through Lulu is 608 pages, royalty free, and costs about $20 ordered one at a time (March 2011). (Any print on demand service could be used – this is just an example. School districts could easily negotiate even lower prices for bulk purchases to be printed in their own communities.) Teacher's editions are available for educators and parents. Titles have been authored by various individuals and organizations and are vetted for quality prior to inclusion in the CK-12 catalog. An effort is underway to map state educational standards correlations. Stanford University provided a number of titles in use.

Curriki is another modular K-12 content non-profit "empowering educators to deliver and share curricula." Selected Curriki materials are also correlated to U.S. state educational standards. Some Curriki content has been collected into open textbooks and some may be used for modular lessons or special topics.

=== International market pricing ===
Similar to the issue of reimportation of pharmaceuticals into the U.S. market, the GAO report also highlights a similar phenomenon in textbook distribution. Retailers and publishers have expressed concern about the re-importation of lower-priced textbooks from international locations. Specifically, they cited the ability students have to purchase books from online distribution channels outside the United States at lower prices, which may result in a loss of sales for U.S. retailers. Additionally, the availability of lower-priced textbooks through these channels has heightened distrust and frustration among students regarding textbook prices, and college stores find it difficult to explain why their textbook prices are higher, according to the National Association of College Stores. Retailers and publishers have also been concerned that some U.S. retailers may have engaged in reimportation on a large scale by ordering textbooks for entire courses at lower prices from international distribution channels. While the 1998 Supreme Court decision Quality King v. L'anza protects the reimportation of copyrighted materials under the first-sale doctrine, textbook publishers have still attempted to prevent the U.S. sale of international editions by enforcing contracts which forbid foreign wholesalers from selling to American distributors. Concerned about the effects of differential pricing on college stores, the National Association of College Stores has called on publishers to stop the practice of selling textbooks at lower prices outside the United States. For example, some U.S. booksellers arrange for drop-shipments in foreign countries which are then re-shipped to America where the books can be sold online at used prices (for a "new" unopened book). The authors often getting half-royalties instead of full-royalties, minus the charges for returned books from bookstores.

=== Production ===
==== Cost distribution ====
According to the National Association of College Stores, the entire cost of the book is justified by expenses, with typically 11.7% of the price of a new book going to the author's royalties (or a committee of editors at the publishing house), 22.7% going to the store, and 64.6% going to the publisher. The store and publisher amounts are slightly higher for Canada. Bookstores and used-book vendors profit from the resale of textbooks on the used market, with publishers only earning profits on sales of new textbooks.

==== Research ====
According to the GAO study published July 2005:

Following closely behind annual increases in tuition and fees at postsecondary institutions, college textbook and supply prices have risen at twice the rate of annual inflation over the last two decades.

Rising at an average of 6 percent each year since academic year 1987–1988, compared with overall average price increases of 3 percent per year, college textbook and supply prices trailed tuition and fee increases, which averaged 7 percent per year. Since December 1986, textbook and supply prices have nearly tripled, increasing by 186 percent, while tuition and fees increased by 240 percent and overall prices grew by 72 percent. While increases in textbook and supply prices have followed increases in tuition and fees, the cost of textbooks and supplies for degree-seeking students as a percentage of tuition and fees varies by the type of institution attended. For example, the average estimated cost of books and supplies per first-time, full-time student for academic year 2003–2004 was $898 at 4-year public institutions, or about 26 percent of the cost of tuition and fees. At 2-year public institutions, where low-income students are more likely to pursue a degree program and tuition and fees are lower, the average estimated cost of books and supplies per first-time, full-time student was $886 in academic year 2003–2004, representing almost three-quarters of the cost of tuition and fees.

According to the 2nd edition of a study by the United States Public Interest Research Group (US PIRG) published in February 2005: "Textbook prices are increasing at more than four times the inflation rate for all finished goods, according to the Bureau of Labor Statistics Producer Price Index. The wholesale prices charged by textbook publishers have jumped 62 percent since 1994, while prices charged for all finished goods increased only 14 percent. Similarly, the prices charged by publishers for general books increased just 19 percent during the same time period."

According to the 2007 edition of the College Board's Trend in College Pricing Report published October 2007: "College costs continue to rise and federal student aid has shown slower growth when adjusted for inflation, while textbooks, as a percentage of total college costs, have remained steady at about 5 percent."

== Education levels ==
=== K-12 ===
In most U.S. K-12 public schools, a local school board votes on which textbooks to purchase from a selection of books that have been approved by the state Department of Education. Teachers receive the books to give to the students for each subject. Teachers are usually not required to use textbooks, however, and many prefer to use other materials instead.

Textbook publishing in the U.S. is a business primarily aimed at large states. This is due to state purchasing controls over the books, most notably in Texas, where the Texas Education Agency sets curricula for all courses taught by the state's 1,000+ school districts, and therefore also approves which textbooks can be purchased.

Commonly used American history textbooks are customized for students in California and Texas.

=== High school ===
In recent years, high school textbooks of United States history have come under increasing criticism. Authors such as Howard Zinn (A People's History of the United States), Gilbert T. Sewall (Textbooks: Where the Curriculum Meets the Child) and James W. Loewen (Lies My Teacher Told Me: Everything Your American History Textbook Got Wrong), make the claim that U.S. history textbooks contain mythical untruths and omissions, which paint a whitewashed picture that bears little resemblance to what most students learn in universities. Inaccurately retelling history, through textbooks or other literature, has been practiced in many societies, from ancient Rome to the Soviet Union (USSR) and the People's Republic of China. The content of history textbooks is often determined by the political forces of state adoption boards and ideological pressure groups.

Science textbooks have been the source of ongoing debates and have come under scrutiny from several organizations. The presentation or inclusion of controversial scientific material has been debated in several court cases. Poorly designed textbooks have been cited as contributing to declining grades in mathematics and science in the United States and organizations such as the American Academy of Arts and Sciences (AAAS) have criticized the layout, presentation, and amount of material given in textbooks.

Discussions of textbooks have been included on creation and evolution in the public education debate. The Smith v. Board of School Commissioners of Mobile County case brought forward a debate about scientific fact being presented in textbooks.

In his book, Surely You're Joking, Mr. Feynman!, the late physics Nobel Prize laureate Richard P. Feynman described his experiences as a member of a committee that evaluated science textbooks. At some instances, there were nonsensical examples to illustrate physical phenomena; then a company sent – for reasons of timing – a textbook that contained blank pages, which even got good critiques. Feynman himself experienced attempts at bribery.

=== Higher education ===
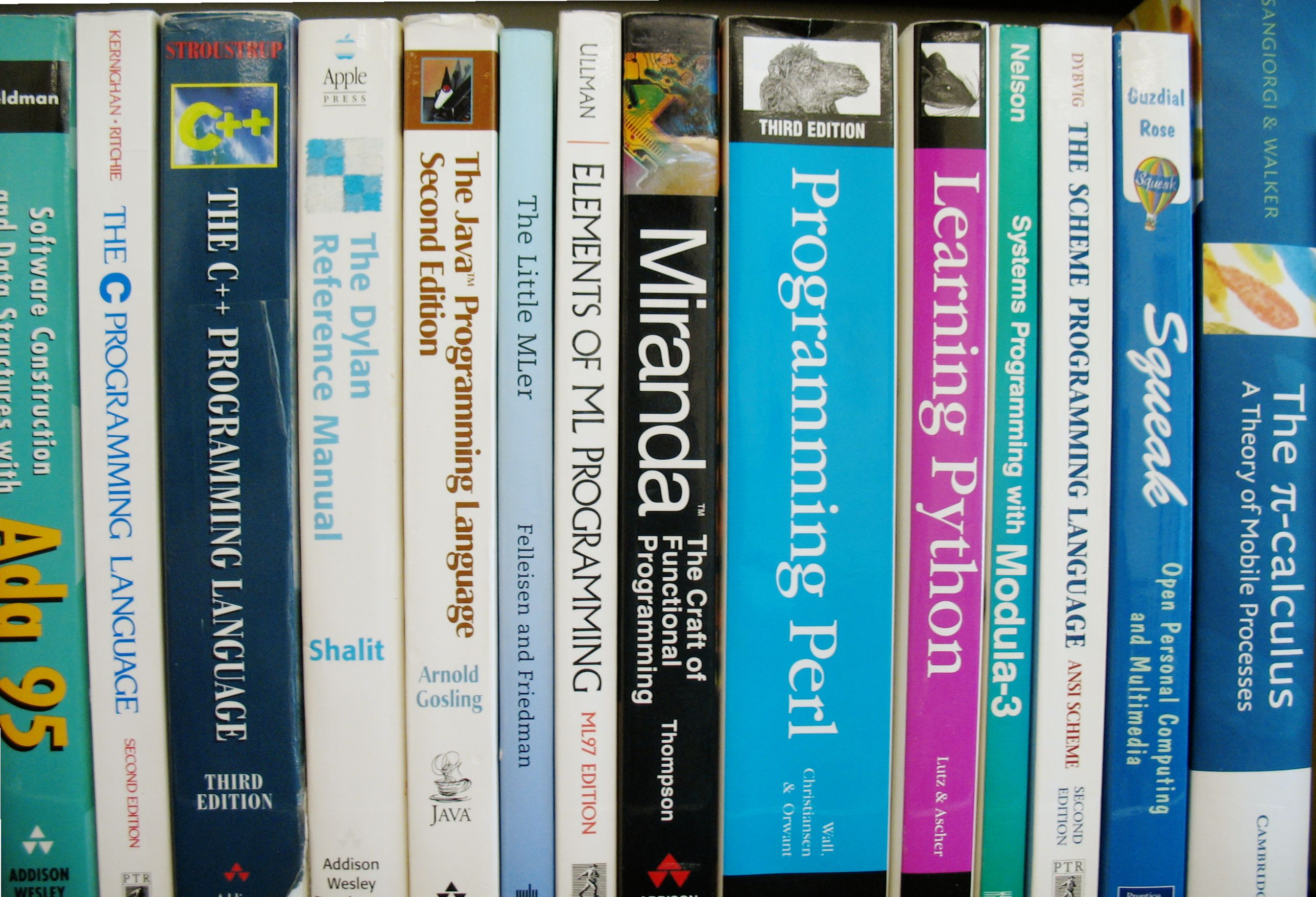
Programming language textbooks

In the U.S., college and university textbooks are chosen by the professor teaching the course, or by the department as a whole. Students are typically responsible for obtaining their own copies of the books used in their courses, although alternatives to owning textbooks, such as textbook rental services and library reserve copies of texts, are available in some instances.

In some European countries, such as Sweden or Spain, students attending institutions of higher education pay for textbooks themselves, although higher education is free of charge otherwise.

With higher education costs on the rise, many students are becoming sensitive to every aspect of college pricing, including textbooks, which in many cases amount to one tenth of tuition costs. The 2005 Government Accountability Office report on college textbooks said that since the 1980s, textbook and supply prices have risen twice the rate of inflation in the past two decades. A 2005 PIRG study found that textbooks cost students $900 per year, and that prices increased four times the rate of inflation over the past decade. A June 2007 Advisory Committee on Student Financial Assistance (ACSFA) report, "Turn the Page", reported that the average U.S. student spends $700–$1000 per year on textbooks.

While many groups have assigned blame to publishers, bookstores or faculty, the ACSFA also found that assigning blame to any one party—faculty, colleges, bookstores or publishers—for current textbook costs is unproductive and without merit. The report called on all parties within the industry to work together to find productive solutions, which included a movement toward open textbooks and other lower-cost digital solutions.

Textbook prices are considerably higher in law school. Students ordinarily pay close to $200 for case books consisting of cases available free online.

== Sourcebooks ==
A sourcebook, sometimes called a reader, is a collection of source literature intended to be an introduction to a particular subject. The selected texts are typically edited, laid out, and typeset in a uniform format before binding, and the result is often a hardcover book similar to a textbook. In contrast, course readers are prepared by photocopying or scanning the selected materials and then adding covers, front matter, tables, and pagination. They are usually bound as softcover books.

In American universities, a sourcebook may function as a supplement to or replacement for a textbook. As a genre, sourcebooks have become more common due to the increasing ease of self-publishing, which has allowed authors and teachers to assemble their own custom packets of readings that function as sourcebooks in their fields. Hence, they may be useful in academic and educational contexts, as they provide a more diverse range of information.

Professor of knowledge organization Birger Hjørland warns, in the context of library and information science, "The word sourcebook is relatively often used in the literature. It is not, however, a meaningful concept. It is sometimes used about bibliographies, sometimes about anthologies, sometimes about collections of pictures etc."

In American law schools, casebooks are similar to sourcebooks, offering selections of legal cases and commentary that form the basis for analysis and discussion. Rather than simply presenting the legal doctrine in a particular area of study, a casebook contains excerpts from legal cases in which the law of that area was applied. It is then up to the student to analyze the language of the case in order to determine which rule was applied and how the court applied it.

== See also ==
Types

- Casebook – a special type of textbook used in law schools in the United States
- Open textbook – a textbook licensed under an open copyright license, and made available online to be freely used
- Problem book – a textbook, usually graduate level, organized as a series of problems and full solutions
- Sourcebook – a collection of texts, often used in social sciences and humanities in the United States
- Study guide – a textbook used to study for a topic, exam, etc.
- Workbook – a type of textbook with practice problems, where answers can be written directly in the book

Lists

- List of medical textbooks
- List of textbooks in electromagnetism
- List of textbooks in thermodynamics and statistical mechanics
- List of textbooks on classical mechanics and quantum mechanics
- List of textbooks on computer programming

Controversies

- Japanese history textbook controversies
- Kanawha County textbook controversy, in the U.S. state of West Virginia
- NCERT textbook controversies, in India
- Pakistani textbooks controversy

Other

- John Amos Comenius – Czech philosopher, pedagogue and theologian who is credited by some with introducing pictorial textbooks
  - Orbis Pictus – 1658 textbook by Comenius, one of the first books with pictures for children
- Kirtsaeng v. John Wiley & Sons, Inc. – a 2013 decision of the United States Supreme Court regarding textbook resale
