= Open management education =

Open management education refers to business and management programs and courses making use of open educational resources and open content. The main idea is to develop competences by re-use, combination and adaptation of freely accessible, existing resources.

== Goals and purpose ==
Programs and trainings in business and management are often not affordable, especially for SMEs or for people in less developed countries. Therefore, open management education seems like a promising alternative for many stakeholders.

== Challenges ==
It is still an ongoing discussion which business models could be applied, such as sharing or add-on models. However, the domain is still developing and no business model has become mainstream. A good discussion can be found by Downes (2007).

Another challenge is to find simple tools to adapt (the sometimes complex) resources.

== Access to open management education ==
There are many repositories, databases and web access points, some of them listed here:

- OpenScout providing access to global resources in the business and management sector. It is possible to search for competences to be achieved and to get help with tools for adaptation (e.g. internationalizing materials, adapting the design, contextualizing), see also the Wikipedia entry for Openscout
- The Khan Academy provides a variety of business courses.
- MIT OpenCourseWare access to courses from MIT, some of them related to management
- MERLOT Repository (Category Business)
- Globe Info (Federation of Repositories): (no browsing, just use keywords such as management or better more specific) Search page
