= Kim Jones (businesswoman) =

American business leader

- Born: 1956 or 1957 (age 68–69)
- Education: University of California, San Diego
- Occupation: CEO of Curriki

Kim Jones (born 1956 or 1957) is an American IT business leader, who is the CEO, chairman and co-founder of Curriki, a non-profit, global online community focused on improving education through technology. Curriki currently has nearly 15 million users and over 260,000 learning resources making extensive use of digital media and social networking.

Formerly, she was president and managing director of Sun Microsystems UK & Ireland. In this role she oversaw all of Sun's UK operations and a P&L of over $1 billion. Prior to this role, Jones was Vice President of Global Education, Government and Healthcare, which she established as Sun's first independent line of business.

Jones has served on a number of boards, public and private, including John Wiley & Sons (where she chaired the governance committee for five years), Curriki, chairman of the board, MIT OpenCourseWare advisory committee, Cornerstone OnDemand Foundation board of directors, the Confederation of British Industry, the UK Climate Change Board, UK Corporate Leadership Group, Western Governors University Board of Trustees, the Jason Foundation Board of Trustees, and the World Bank Institute Advisory Board.

Jones has received numerous awards and recognition throughout her career including the Sun Leadership Award, the prestigious YWCA Award for Women in Business, and in 2006, she was inducted into the Women in Technology International (WITI) Hall of Fame. Jones has an honorary PhD from the University of Edinburgh, and graduated with a Bachelor of Arts degree from University of California, San Diego, where she has recently been named as one of their 50 Years, 50 Leaders honorees.
