= Refugee Phrasebook =

Online bilingual lists of useful phrases for refugees

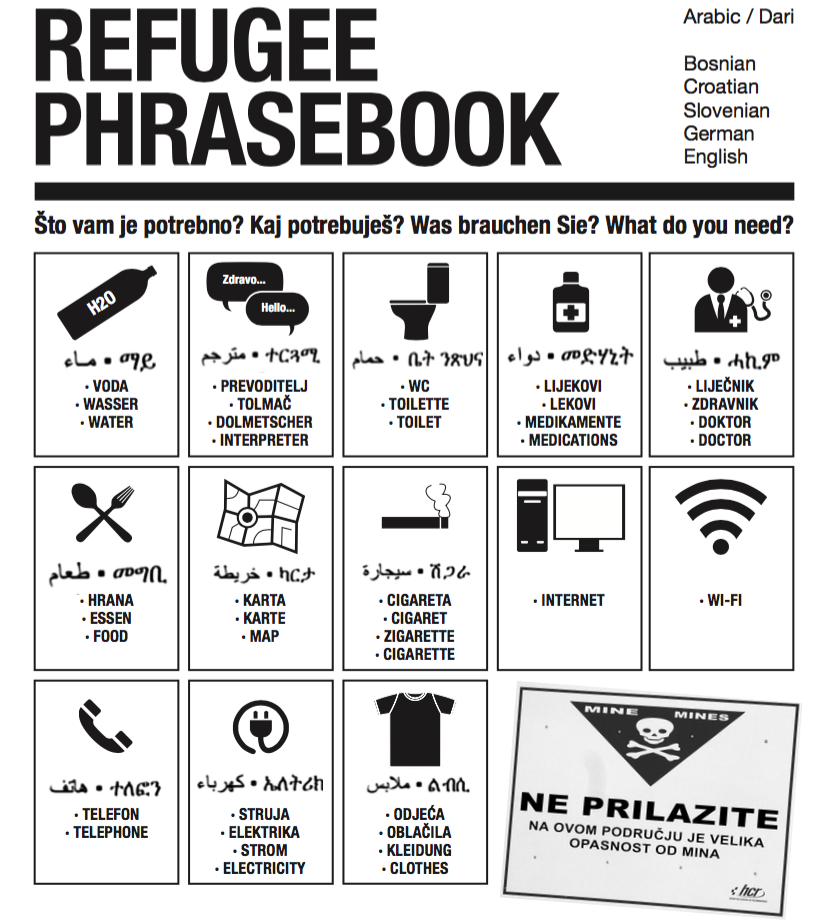
- Refugee Phrasebook in Slovene language
- Language: Multilingual
- Genre: Phrasebook
- Publisher: Open Knowledge Foundation Deutschland
- Publication date: 2015
- Publication place: Berlin, Germany
- Media type: Open data project under Creative Commons license (CC0)
- Award: Prix Ars Electronica “Award of Distinction” for Digital Communities (2016)
- Website: refugeephrasebook.de

Refugee Phrasebook is an online collection of useful vocabulary and phrases for refugees who have recently arrived in various European and potentially other host countries. Published as open source software, it is a multilingual tool that provides basic useful vocabulary related to the most common immediate needs of refugees and their helpers. As of early 2022, it provides phrases in more than 28 languages, including Arabic, Persian, Turkish, Dari, Bosnian, Albanian, English, German, Hungarian and others. In order to support refugees having to communicate in new linguistic situations, everyone is free to adapt, print and distribute pairs of translated important phrases in basic everyday situations.

== Description ==
Refugee Phrasebook was started by women with immigrant backgrounds in Berlin, Germany, in the context of the arrival of hundreds of thousands refugees in 2015. It is an open collaborative project to provide basic vocabulary to refugees. It assembles important phrases from various fields and encourages designers and experts in the field to improve on the material. While the first collection of phrases was limited to a closed document with a narrow focus, volunteers quickly migrated the data to an open table in Google Sheets and significantly increased the number of participants with their network. This step also emphasized a commitment to transparency and openness by publishing the data with a Creative Commons license (CC0), reuseable for refugee aid projects everywhere. Due to translation requests from helpers, the length of the tables has more than tripled since the beginning. As of early 2022, the phrases now include a broad range of topics covering a general set of phrases as well as sentences for juridical and medical needs, from a simple “Hello” to "I don't understand", “I need to see a doctor”, "I was stabbed", and "sorry, there is nothing left".

Local initiatives are welcome to adapt, print and distribute all contents of the project's page to support refugees in all regions. It currently contains vocabulary in 28 languages:

- Refugee Phrasebook (orientation / multipurpose) currently >561 items in >44 languages
- Medical Phrasebook currently 150 items in 28 languages, ca. 80% translated
- Juridical Phrasebook currently looking for lawyers to contribute

Prompted by the 2022 Russian invasion of Ukraine, Refugee Phrasebook added useful phrases in Ukrainian, English and languages of host countries such as German, Polish and Slovakian.

The project is noncommercial, the books are available for free and provided without further political or personal branding. The content is freely available under a Creative Commons License (CC0) and can be reused by anyone everywhere.

Supported by the Open Knowledge Foundation Germany, the project is coordinated by the Berlin-based support group “Refugee Phrasebook“ and is constantly expanded by numerous volunteers, among them Wikimedia Deutschland. Further, it does not claim ownership of the content, since it is a crowdfunded effort.

Detailed and updated information about the project as well as printable versions of the phrasebooks for different regions are published as Refugee Phrasebook at Wikibooks.

== Recognition ==
Refugee Phrasebook was recommended in March 2022 as a useful tool for digital translation next to Google Translate and Microsoft Translator by the German website Redaktionsnetzwerk Deutschland. According to Creative Commons, the project has spread all over Europe, attracting global press such as The Guardian, Wired, Newsweek, STERN magazine, Die Zeit, and Der Spiegel, as well as winning the Prix Ars Electronica “Award of Distinction” for Digital Communities.

== See also ==
- Refugee
- Right of asylum
