= Murugan Pal =

American businessman (1966–2012)

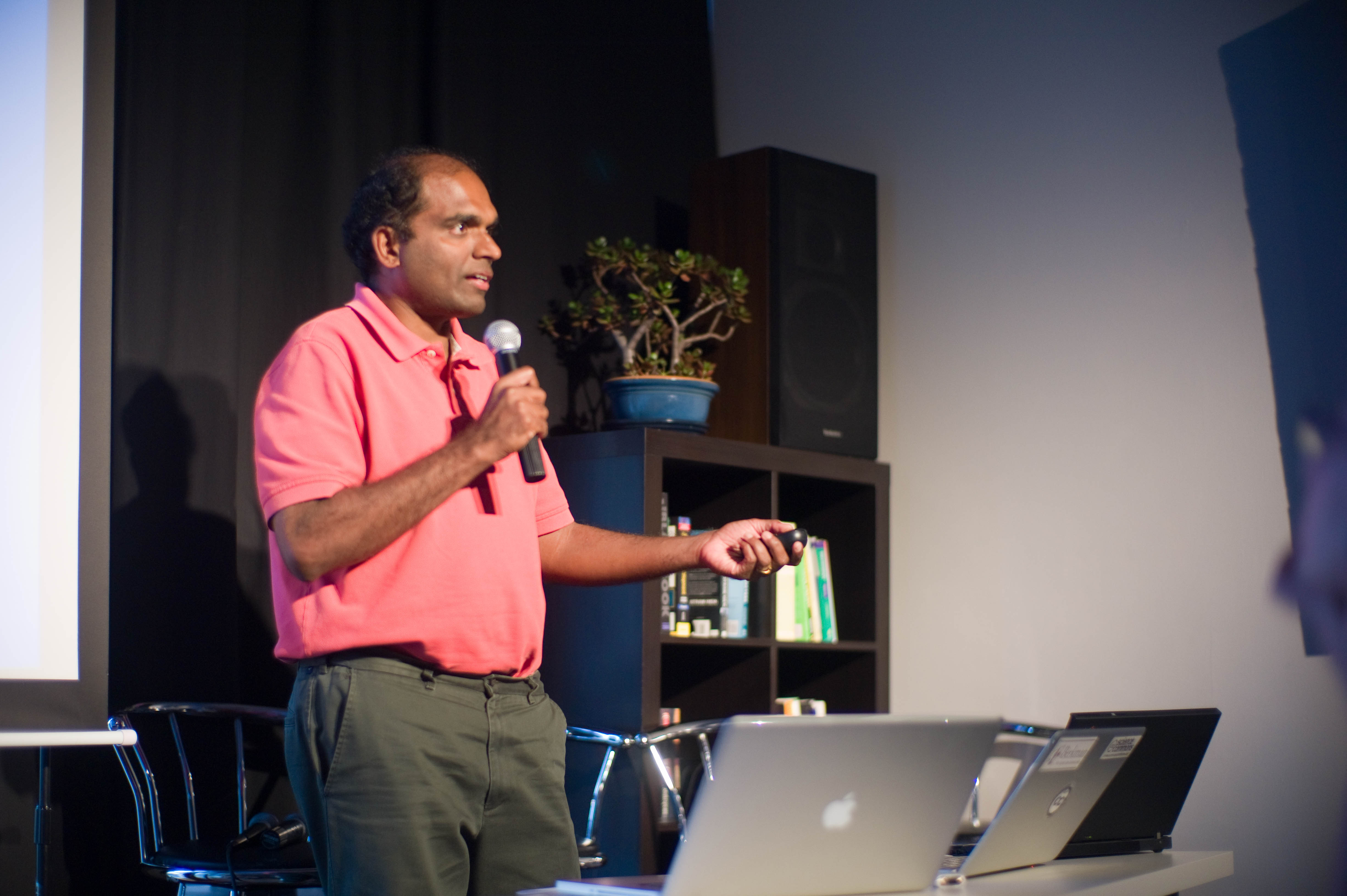
Murugan Pal

Murugan Palaniappan (1966 – October 30, 2012) popularly known as Murugan Pal was a serial entrepreneur based in Silicon Valley, Bay Area, US.

Murugan was the co-founder and president of CK-12 Foundation, a non-profit organization launched in 2006 that aims to reduce the cost of textbook materials for the K-12 market both in the US and worldwide.

Before founding the CK-12 Foundation, Murugan was an EIR with Foundation Capital. Previously, Murugan was the founder and CTO of SpikeSource. Before founding SpikeSource, Pal was an entrepreneur-in-residence with venture capital firm Kleiner, Perkins, Caufield & Byers. Previously, he was a founding engineer of e-business software company Asera, Inc. Before Asera, Pal was a principal developer at Oracle Corporation in the Application Server division and was part of the company's early XML initiatives. Prior to Oracle, he was one of the lead developers of Versant Corporation's Object Database. Pal worked on real-time enterprise technologies, composite applications, service-oriented architecture runtimes, relational databases, object databases, and robotics and manufacturing automation.

Pal held a bachelor's degree in mechanical engineering from Thiagarajar College of Engineering, affiliated to Madurai University in India, a master's in industrial engineering from Arizona State University, a master's in computer science from Arizona State University, and was a doctoral candidate in industrial engineering at Arizona State University.

In 2010, Pal was diagnosed with amyotrophic lateral sclerosis or ALS. He died on October 30, 2012.
