= Students Circle Network =

- Website type: Social networking service
- Founded: 2010; 16 years ago
- Headquarters: Kyrenia, Northern Cyprus
- Founder: Gossy Ukanwoke
- Key people: Samora Reid, CEO; Chika Uwazie, VP of Channels; Amby Uche, Products Development

Students Circle Network was a global social networking service for university and secondary school students that provided over 10,400 academic courses of various levels from over 200 OpenCourseWare members worldwide, as well as study groups in various academic disciplines with online chat, and social-network games. The platform was an OpenCourseWare consortium member.

The platform was free to students studying business, computing, engineering, sciences and humanities. It had members from over 120 countries and 200 universities as well as many secondary schools. Membership was open to students, researchers, and teachers. It was self-funded.

Users were able to create a "something akin to a Facebook profile for [their] academic interests".

== History ==
The network was started as a personal project of Gospel "Gossy" Ukanwoke, in Kyrenia, Northern Cyprus, in June 2010, as a collaboration tool for students at Girne American University, where he was studying.

Gossy Ukanwoke was referred to as the Mark Zuckerberg of Nigeria and as "Africa's top technology entrepreneur".

In December 2010, the platform was launched worldwide and reached 1 million visits. By January 2011, it reached 2 million visits and was averaging over 50,000 visits daily.

In April 2012, Gossy Ukanwoke resigned from active management of the platform to focus on the creation of Beni American University, with a goal of creating affordable education in Africa.

In 2012, Students Circle Network was a finalist at the Future Africa Awards in the Innovation in Education Category.

Students Circle Network won the People's Choice Award from Study.com.

== Partnerships ==
In addition to the OpenCourseWare member universities, Students Circle Network partnered with non-OpenCourseWare member universities, including:

- InfiniteGraph
- Girne American University, Northern Cyprus
- Encipher Group
