= Neeru Khosla =

Indian American businesswoman

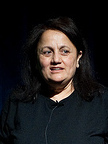
- Khosla in 2010
- Born: 1955 or 1956 (age 70–71); Delhi, India
- Education: San Jose State University; Stanford Graduate School of Education
- Known for: Co-founder and chair, CK12 Foundation
- Board member of: Wikimedia Foundation
- Spouse: Vinod Khosla
- Children: 4
- Football career

Seattle Seahawks
- Title: Owner

Career history
- Seattle Seahawks (2026–present) Owner

Neeru Khosla (born 1955/1956) is an Indian American businesswoman. Khosla is the co-founder of the non-profit CK12 Foundation and the controlling owner of the Seattle Seahawks of the National Football League (NFL). She, along with her husband Vinod Khosla, acquired the Seahawks in 2026 for over $9 billion.

== Early life ==
Having grown up in India and England, Khosla wanted to be a doctor. She had an aptitude for science, but the prerequisite for medicine of animal dissection pushed her to pursue molecular biology instead.

Khosla focused her studies in India on science and moved to the U.S. shortly after marrying Vinod Khosla in 1980. Around the time he co-founded Sun Microsystems, she earned a master's degree in molecular biology from San Jose State University. Soon, she started a job studying gene expression at Stanford University. She also has a master's degree in education from the Stanford Graduate School of Education.

== Career ==
In December 2008, it was announced that Khosla had been appointed to the Wikimedia Foundation advisory board. She has been on the boards of other organizations including the American India Foundation and DonorsChoose.

Khosla and her family's purchase of the Seattle Seahawks was approved by the National Football League on August 26, 2026. The sale of the team was finalized on September 3 with Kholsa, herself, being named as controlling owner. Simultaneously, her husband, Vinod, was named chair and her son, Neal, was named vice chair.

== Personal life ==
She is married to the billionaire engineer and venture capitalist Vinod Khosla, her childhood boyfriend. They have four children.

Sporting positions
| Preceded by Jody Allen | Seattle Seahawks principal owner 2026–present | Incumbent |
