= Wikibooks =

Wikimedia project for free content textbooks

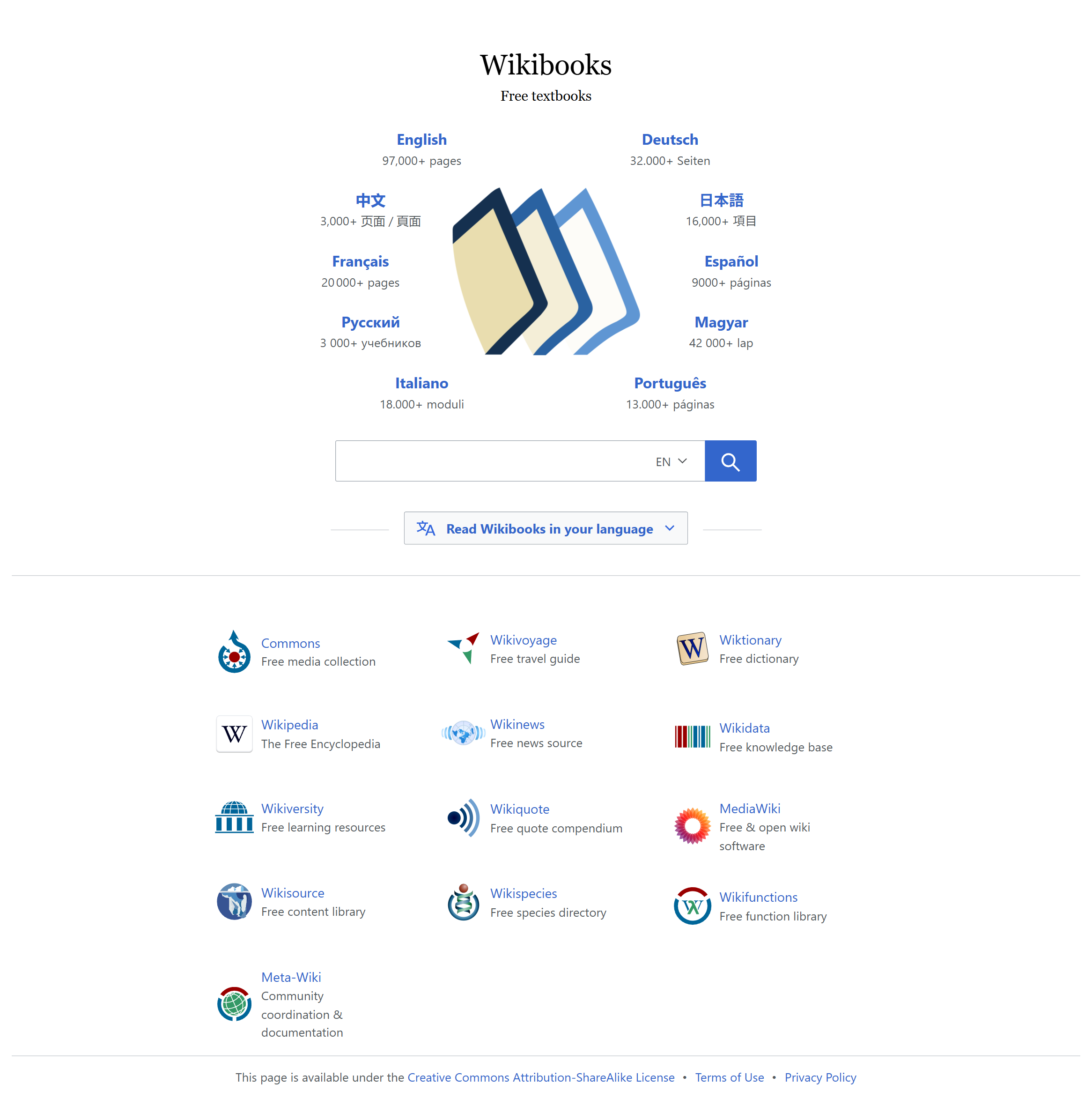
- Screenshot Screenshot of wikibooks.org home page
- Website type: Textbooks wiki
- Available in: Multilingual (77 active)
- Owner: Wikimedia Foundation
- Creators: Karl Wick and the Wikimedia Community
- Website: wikibooks.org
- Commercial: No
- Registration: Optional
- Launched: July 10, 2003; 23 years ago
- Current status: Active

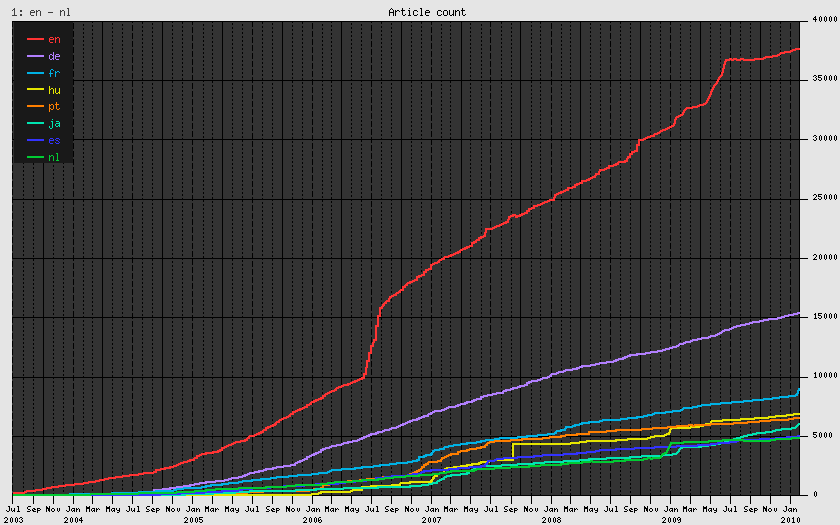
Growth of the eight largest Wikibooks sites (by language), July 2003–January 2010

Wikibooks is a wiki-based Wikimedia project hosted by the Wikimedia Foundation for the creation of free content digital textbooks and annotated texts that anyone can edit.

Initially, the project was created solely in English in July 2003; a later expansion to include additional languages was started in July 2004. As of November 2026, there are Wikibooks sites active for 77 languages comprising a total of 367,545 articles and 1,692 recently active editors. At primary stages it was called Wikimedia Free Textbook Project and Wikimedia-Textbooks.

== History ==
The wikibooks.org domain was registered on July 19, 2003. It was launched to host and build free textbooks on subjects such as organic chemistry and physics, in response to a request by Wikipedia contributor Karl Wick. Three major sub-projects, Wikijunior, Cookbook and Wikiversity, were created within Wikibooks before its official policy was later changed so that future incubator-type projects are started according to the Wikimedia Foundation's new project policy.

In August 2006, Wikiversity became an independent Wikimedia Foundation project.

Since 2008, Wikibooks has been included in BASE.

In June 2016, Compete.com estimated that Wikibooks had 1,478,812 unique visitors.

=== Wikijunior ===
Wikijunior is a subproject of Wikibooks that specializes in books for children. The project consists of both a magazine and a website, and is currently being developed in English, Danish, Finnish, French, German, Italian, Japanese, Spanish, Arabic and Bangla. It is funded by a grant from the Beck Foundation.

== Book content ==
Visualization of the development in the German Wikibook project Mathe für Nicht-Freaks

While some books are original, others began as text copied over from other sources of free content textbooks found on the Internet. All of the site's content is released under a Creative Commons Attribution-ShareAlike license (or a compatible license). This means that, as with its sister project, Wikipedia, contributions remain copyrighted to their creators, while the licensing ensures that it can be freely distributed and reused subject to certain conditions.

How English Wikibooks is structured

Wikibooks differs from Wikisource in that Wikisource collects exact copies and original translations of existing free content works, such as the original text of Shakespearean plays, while Wikibooks is dedicated either to original works, significantly altered versions of existing works, or annotations to original works.

== Multilingual statistics ==
As of November 2026, there are Wikibooks sites for 122 languages of which 77 are active and 45 are closed. The active sites have 367,545 articles and the closed sites have 671 articles. There are 4,951,082 registered users of which 1,692 are recently active.

All of the Wikibooks language projects over 5,000 books by mainspace article count:

1. English: 98,464 books
2. Hungarian: 45,778 books
3. German: 33,728 books
4. French: 21,296 books
5. Italian: 19,737 books
6. Japanese: 17,246 books
7. Portuguese: 13,972 books
8. Spanish: 9,722 books
9. Dutch: 9,138 books
10. Vietnamese: 8,187 books
11. Polish: 6,967 books
12. Indonesian: 5,533 books
13. Finnish: 5,051 books

== Reception ==
Meng-Fen et al. suggested that while there isn't much social connection between contributors of Wikibooks, the contributors had no major issues coordinating to write books. Ravid et al found that participation in book projects followed a long tail distribution, where a small number of editors made many of the edits, but most edits were produced by low-edit-count editors.

== See also ==
- CK-12 Foundation
- Digital library
- European Library
- Free High School Science Texts
- Global Text
- ibiblio
- LibreTexts
- LibriVox, an online digital library of free public domain audiobooks.
- Open Content Alliance
- Open textbook
- Project Gutenberg
- Universal library
- WikiToLearn
