= SlideWiki =

- SlideWiki authoring environment
- Developer: University of Leipzig
- Stable release: 2.5 / 29 Sep 2017
- Written in: JavaScript
- Operating system: Cross-platform
- Type: Learning Content Management System
- License: Mozilla Public license 2.0
- Website: slidewiki.github.io

SlideWiki is an open web-based OpenCourseWare authoring system. It supports learning content authoring and management (including SCORM 2004 compliance) and tools for collaboration/crowd-sourcing, translation, communication, evaluation and assessment, supporting the publication of open educational resources

== Concept ==
SlideWiki is a Web application facilitating the collaboration around educational content. With SlideWiki users can create and collaborate on slides and arrange slides in presentations. Presentations can be organized hierarchically, so as to structure them reasonably according to their content. Currently large-scale collaboration (also referred to as crowd-sourcing) around educational content (other than texts) is supported only in a very limited way. Slides, presentations, diagrams, assessment tests etc. are mainly created by tutors, teachers, lecturers and professors individually or in very small groups. The resulting content can be shared online (e.g. using Slideshare, OpenStudy, Google Docs). However, proper community collaboration, authoring, versioning, branching, reuse and re-purposing of educational content similarly as we know it from the open-source software community is currently not supported.

SlideWiki is a platform, where potentially large communities of teachers, lecturers, academics are empowered to create sophisticated educational content in a collaborative way. For newly emerging research fields, for example, a collaboration facility such as SlideWiki allows disseminating content and educating PhD students and peer-researchers more rapidly, since the burden of creating and structuring the new field can be distributed among a large community. Specialists for individual aspects of the new field can focus on creating educational content in their particular area of expertise and still this content can be easily integrated with other content, re-structured and re-purposed. A particular aspect, which is facilitated by SlideWiki is multi-linguality. Since all content is versioned and richly structured, it is easy to semi-automatically translate content and to keep track of changes in various multi-lingual versions of the same content object.

== Features ==
SlideWiki particularly focusses on the crowd-sourced authoring, translation support and enrichment of educational content with self-assessment questions. Features include:

- WYSIWYG slide authoring
- Logical slide and deck representation
- LaTeX/MathML integration
- Multilingual decks / semi-automatic translation in 50+ languages
- PowerPoint/HTML import
- Source code highlighting within slides
- Dynamic CSS themability and transitions
- Social networking activities
- Full revisioning and branching of slides and decks
- E-Learning with self-assessment questionnaires
- Source, citation and attribution tracking
- Synchronization and remote control of presentations

== SlideWiki H2020 project ==
SlideWikis future development has been established with the beginning of the year 2016 as an EU funded project. It was reengineered on a new technology stack and released on the official SlideWiki.org platform in 2017. 17 partner institutes from all over Europe and also South America cooperate in order to improve SlideWiki and implement many new features and enhance the user experience in order to become a central hub for open educational resources, especially presentations.

== Bibliography ==
- Darya Tarasowa, Ali Khalili, Sören Auer and Jörg Unbehauen: CrowdLearn: Crowd-sourcing the Creation of Highly-structured E-Learning Content. 5th International Conference on Computer Supported Education (CSEDU 2013)
- Ali Khalili, Sören Auer, Darya Tarasowa and Ivan Ermilov: SlideWiki: Elicitation and Sharing of Corporate Knowledge using Presentations. Proceedings of the EKAW 2012, LNCS 7603, Springer 2012, ISBN 978-3-642-33875-5.
