= MIT Open Learning =

MIT Open Learning is a Massachusetts Institute of Technology (MIT) organization, headed by Dimitris Bertsimas, that oversees several MIT educational initiatives, such as MIT Open CourseWare, MITx, MicroMasters, MIT Bootcamps and others.

MIT Open Learning develops new "to-campus" and "to-job" pathways for learners by combining its credentials (MicroMasters), online programs (MITx) and in-person programs (MIT Bootcamps).

MIT Open Learning is composed of the following programmatic units:

- MIT Open Courseware
- MITx MicroMasters
- MIT Integrated Learning Initiative
- MIT xPro
- MIT Bootcamps

== See also ==
- edX
- Massive open online course
- MITx
- MIT OpenCourseWare
- Sanjay Sarma
