= California Open Source Textbook Project =

The California Open Source Textbook Project (COSTP) was founded in 2000 by Sanford Forte, a former college textbook publishing executive. COSTP was a not-for-profit, collaborative, public/private undertaking originally created to address the high cost, content range, and consistent shortages of K-12 textbooks in California. COSTP's mandate later expanded to include undergraduate and graduate university instructional materials, covering the entire K-20 range.

== The plan ==
COSTP's main goals were:

- Leveraging free, already-existing, and widely available educational content in the public domain
- Better leveraging the substantial curriculum-based intellectual capital of California's best K-12 teachers
- Better leveraging the substantial intellectual capital of American college and university instructors to enable open-licensed content for their institutions.
- Using innovative copyright tools to secure new and dormant K-12 textbook content that would not otherwise be made available.
- Substantially reducing the cost of textbooks for K-20 students and sponsoring institutions.
- Complete elimination of the then-current US$400M+ line item for California's K-12 textbooks
- Significant increase in the range of content afforded to California's K-12 textbooks
- Permanent end to California's textbook shortages
- Creation of fully portable content holdings database that scales with classroom technologies as they are introduced.

The cost of textbooks had risen steadily over the years preceding COSTP's founding. Critics contended that publishing companies artificially increased prices and essentially shut out competing efforts to liberate academic content from traditional copyright control. On COSTP's inception, the State of California was spending more than US$400M annually for K-12 textbooks, yet textbook shortages were not uncommon. Cost and access were becoming serious issues—projected to get worse as enrollments to K-12 institutions were projected to dramatically increase over the next decade.

COSTP employed the advantages of open-sourced content and innovative licensing tools in an effort to inspire significantly reduced K-12 textbook costs—with the hope of eventually turning K-12 curriculum and textbook construction from a cost into a revenue generator for the State of California. Open sourced, distributed content was intended to be made available gratis by deploying innovative copyright tools provided by organizations like Creative Commons, its partners, and other organizations. COSTP made important contributions to the many organizations that followed in its wake, as the "Open Educational Content" movement took hold over the next 10–15 years.

COSTP's mandate was not to replace printed textbooks, but simply make them less expensive to produce and distribute, thus creating many additional efficiencies in the K-12 academic content sector.

COSTP eventually graduated into a consulting role for many new entries to the Open Educational Resource (OER) sector, assisting many institutions with business modeling and analysis of textbook and online education markets, worldwide.

== See also ==
- Free High School Science Texts - South Africa
- Open educational resources
