= WikiToLearn =

Knowledge base

- Founded: July 24, 2015
- Founder: Riccardo Iaconelli
- Type: Community, Education
- Purpose: Open textbooks, Science
- Parent organization: KDE
- Website: www.wikitolearn.org
- Formerly called: WikiFM

WikiToLearn was a collaborative, international, free knowledge project, run entirely by volunteers, and dedicated to creating free and accessible textbooks for higher education. In December 2013, it joined the KDE Project through its incubation process with multiple sponsors like Wikimedia Italia.

== History ==
WikiToLearn started as WikiFM in Milan by a group of science students from the University of Milan Bicocca on May 1, 2012. WikiFM was originally launched as a private wiki to exchange links, suggestions, and other information related to studying at the University of Milan Bicocca.

In May 2013 the website has been publicly announced using some money destined to student associations of the University of Milan Bicocca. For this historical reason, while the project has an international aim, the bulk of the oldest content is in Italian.

In September 2013 WikiFM received the sponsorship of Wikimedia Italia. In December 2013, WikiFM officially joined the KDE project, by entering, as first project, KDE's incubator program. It was later advertised by the KDE project as one of its most important success stories.

== From WikiFM to WikiToLearn ==
2015 has been the turning point for the project. The key event happened during KDE's annual conference, Akademy. In July 2015, Riccardo Iaconelli has given a speech on the WikiFM project in order to submit it to the attention of the international community. On this occasion, the website has enriched to accommodate multiple languages, to embrace a larger number of people using their native language. Following the initial feedback, WikiFM was subsequently renamed to WikiToLearn. The project thus started to gather a more official attention from educational institutions. The first foundation interested in using WikiToLearn as a training/tutoring platform has been the High Energy Physics Software Foundation, which experimentally tried its own section on the English website. Several professors from different institutions have subsequently started to collaborate on WikiToLearn, like CERN, HSF, and Fermilab. In September 2015, the University of Milano-Bicocca became the first institution to officially back the project, asking professors and students to populate the portal with educational content.

== The project ==
WikiToLearn stated goal was to provide free textbooks to the world.

Content was written by both students, who ideally start to create textbooks while studying the subject in question, and professors, who provide thorough fact-checking and accuracy.

Given the technical nature of the topics, there was a complex review and rating system under review to try to measure the quality of the individual articles.

== See also ==
- Open textbooks
- Free High School Science Texts
- California Open Source Textbook Project
