= Open textbook =

Online textbook under an open license

An open textbook is a textbook licensed under an open license, and made available online to be freely used by students, teachers and members of the public. Many open textbooks are distributed in either print, e-book, or audio formats that may be downloaded or purchased at little or no cost.

Part of the broader open educational resources movement, open textbooks increasingly are seen as a solution to challenges with traditionally published textbooks, such as access and affordability concerns. Open textbooks were identified in the New Media Consortium's 2010 Horizon Report as a component of the rapidly progressing adoption of open content in higher education. Open books are typically distributed by open-licensed publishers or by writers themselves. A portion of the expense of college textbooks is offset by the easy access to material provided by open source textbooks. While certain open source textbooks can be used for free, others have a nominal usage fee. A digital copy of a printed book that can be read on computers, tablets, and smartphones is called an electronic book, or ebook for short.

== Usage rights ==
The defining difference between open textbooks and traditional textbooks is that the copyright permissions on open textbooks allow the public to freely use, adapt and distribute the material. Open textbooks either reside in the public domain or are released under an open license that grants usage rights to the public so long as the author is attributed.

The copyright permissions on open textbooks extend to all members of the public and cannot be rescinded. These permissions include the right to do the following:

- use the textbook freely
- create and distribute copies of the textbook
- adapt the textbook by revising it or combining it with other materials

Some open licenses limit these rights to non-commercial use or require that adapted versions be licensed the same as the original.

=== Open licenses ===
Some examples of open licenses are:

- Creative Commons Attribution (CC BY)
- Creative Commons Attribution Share-Alike (CC BY-SA)
- Creative Commons Attribution Non-Commercial Share-Alike (CC BY-NC-SA)
- GNU Free Documentation License

Waivers of copyright that place materials in the public domain include:

- Creative Commons Public Domain Tools: CC0 (if you are the copyright holder) and the Creative Commons Public Domain Mark (to be applied to works "free of known copyright restrictions")

== Affordability ==
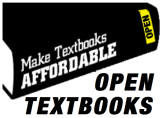
Everything you wanted to know about abstract algebra, but were afraid to buy

Open textbooks increasingly are seen as an affordable alternative to traditional textbooks in both K-12 and higher education. In both cases, open textbooks offer both dramatic up-front savings and the potential to drive down traditional textbook prices through competition.

=== Higher education ===
In the United States, textbook costs increased 88% from July 2006 to July 2016. For this reason, in 2019, students were recommended to budget at least $1,230 per year for textbooks. Overall, open textbooks have been found by the Student Public Interest Research Groups (PIRGs) to offer 80% or more savings to higher education students over traditional textbooks.

In 2010, research commissioned by the Florida state legislature pointed to the savings potential open textbooks could secure for students. Legislative reports in Texas and North Dakota also pointed to the potential of open textbook programs to secure cost savings. State-backed initiatives began in Washington, Ohio, California, and Texas. In Canada, the province of British Columbia became the first jurisdiction to have a similar open textbook program. In subsequent years, various state, provincial, national, and institutional initiatives emerged to support creation and use of open textbooks.

Open Oregon, a state-funded initiative active since 2015, indicated in an annual report that open textbooks can not only secure significant savings for students, these savings compound over time as materials are reused. For instance, Open Oregon initially offered $52,098 in funding for open textbooks in 2015. By 2019, the program estimated that students in Oregon higher education had secured $477,409.24 in savings.

Organizations supporting creation of open textbooks cite other reasons for doing so that go beyond cost savings. In 2010, the Florida state legislature pointed to "compelling academic reasons" for using open textbooks that included: "improved quality, flexibility and access to resources, interactive and active learning experiences, currency of textbook information, broader professional collaboration, and the use of teaching and learning technology to enhance educational experiences" (OATTF, p. i).

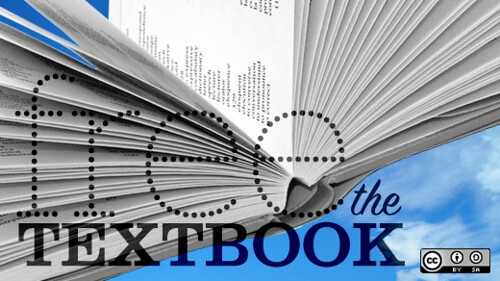

Based on survey data gathered in September 2020, Student PIRGs cited additional reasons for supporting accessible open textbooks in light of the evolving COVID-19 pandemic. They noted that, while commercial textbook prices had not continued to surge in the past year, students experiencing economic uncertainty, food shortages, and limited access to Internet were more likely to forgo or lose access to course materials. This report highlighted the economic inequalities that are further exacerbated by an educational market characterized by cost inflation and demanding technological requirements.

==== Research ====
A meta-analysis of 22 studies of 100,012 students found that there were no differences between open and commercial textbooks for learning performance. Students enrolled in courses with open textbooks had a lower withdrawal rate than students enrolled in courses in commercial textbooks. Systematic reviews of open educational resources, including open textbooks, concluded that faculty and student perceptions of the quality of open textbooks was comparable to that of commercial textbooks.

==== Platforms ====
Open textbooks and other open educational resources may be found on several platforms, typically organized by universities and non-profit organizations, such as MERLOT. The University of Minnesota Open Textbook library is coordinated through the Center for Open Education and is a repository of downloadable open textbooks. OpenStax is both a platform for locating open textbooks and an open textbook creator. Peer review is a common practice across platforms.

=== K–12 education ===
Research at Brigham Young University has produced a web-based cost comparison calculator for traditional and open K-12 textbooks. To use the calculator the inputs commercial textbook cost, planned replacement frequency, and number of annual textbook user count are required. A section is provided to input time requirements for adaptation to local needs, annual updating hours, labor rate, and an approximation of pages. The summary section applies an industry standard cost for print-on-demand of the adapted open textbook to provide a cost per student per year for both textbook options. A summed cost differential over the planned period of use is also calculated.

== Milestones ==
Several organizations, publishers, and initiatives have taken a lead in furthering open textbook publishing, particularly in North America.

In 2002, the second edition of the textbook Essentials of Glycobiology was made freely available on NCBI Bookshelf through the collaboration of the textbook's executive editor, UC San Diego glycobiologist Ajit Varki, the publisher Cold Springs Harbor Laboratory Press, and then-director of the NCBI, David J. Lipman. It was both the first open textbook and the first entirely online textbook, with each chapter having individual PMIDs for ease of access and citations.

In early 2011, Connexions announced a series of two grants that would allow the platform to produce a total of 20 open textbooks ultimately distributed as the OpenStax collection. Initially funded by the Bill and Melinda Gates Foundation, the William and Flora Hewlett Foundation, the Michelson 20MM Foundation, and the Maxfield Foundation, this project expanded over an 18-month time frame to include open textbooks for Anatomy & Physiology, Sociology, Biology, Biology for non-majors, and Physics. The second phase of the OpenStax project would produce an additional 15 titles. The most expensive part of this process was image rights clearing with cleared images becoming available for reuse in even more titles. As of June 2021, OpenStax indicates that their textbooks are in use in 60% of U.S. colleges and universities and 100 countries worldwide.

In February 2012, the Saylor Foundation sponsored an "Open Textbook Challenge", offering a $20,000 reward for newly written open textbooks or existing textbooks released under a CC BY license.

After its launch in 2012, the BC Open Textbook Pilot went on to win many accolades for its commitment to providing open textbooks to students in British Columbia, Canada. BCcampus was tasked with coordinating the program, whose goal was to "make higher education more accessible by reducing student cost through the use of openly licensed textbooks." BCcampus' catalog of open textbooks is widely regarded as a leading source of information about existing OER in Canada. The organization has taken the lead in educating the OER community about textbook accessibility via its Accessibility Toolkit. In 2015 and 2016, BCcampus won Creative Innovation and Open Education Excellence awards from the Open Education Consortium. In 2018, it won a SPARC Innovator Award.

In 2012, David Ernst, a faculty member in the College of Education and Human Development at the University of Minnesota, founded Open Textbook Library (OTL) to help other faculty members locate and adopt open textbooks. Ernst launched traveling workshops that presented the concept of OER to faculty members and invited them to review textbooks in OTL using a pre-set rubric. In 2014, Ernst created Open Textbook Network to provide peer support to institutions looking to expand their open education initiatives. Later renamed Open Education Network, this organization had grown by June 2021 to comprise 140 members and 1,147 campuses across North America and select locations worldwide. Its initiatives came to include local workshops, a publishing cooperative, a certificate in OER Librarianship, and an annual Summer Summit. Meanwhile, Open Textbook Library had grown to 883 textbooks by June 2021.

In 2013, the Maricopa County Community College District launched the Maricopa Millions Study. The goal of this project was to "radically decrease student costs by offering LOW COST or NO COST options for course materials." The project aimed to save students $5 in five years.

In 2013, Tidewater Community College rolled out the first known degree program using exclusively zero-cost course materials. Tidewater's Associate of Science in Business Administration was known as a "Z-Degree" program, and in 2017 the college reported that the degree had garnered students $1 million in savings to date.

Based in Canada, the Rebus Foundation emerged in the 2010s to provide support for authors seeking to publish open textbooks. The foundation provides professional development, facilitates workshops, and encourages authors to connect over shared OER projects.

Also emerging in the 2010s, Pressbooks set out to provide "open-source, book production ... built around the WordPress platform." Since the platform's introduction, many institutions have built open textbook publishing efforts around Pressbooks. Some of the results may be viewed on the Pressbooks Directory. As of June 2021, more than 2,500 books had been published to the directory.

== Awards ==
Because authors do not make money from the sale of open textbooks, many organizations have tried to use prizes or grants as financial incentives for writing open textbooks or releasing existing textbooks under open licenses. Examples of grants and awards follow.

In November 2010, Anthony Brandt was awarded an "Access to Artistic Excellence" grant from the National Endowment for the Arts for his innovative music appreciation course in Connexions. "Sound Reasoning" "takes a new approach [to teaching music appreciation]: It presents style-transcendent principles, illustrated by side-by-side examples from both traditional and contemporary music. The goal is to empower listeners to be able to listen attentively and think intelligently about any kind of music, no matter its style. Everything is listening based; no ability to read music is required." The module being completed with grant funds is entitled "Hearing Harmony". Brandt cites choosing the Connexions open content publishing platform because "it was an opportunity to present an innovative approach in an innovative format, with the musical examples interpolated directly into the text."

In December 2010, open textbook publisher Flat World Knowledge was recognized by the American Library Association's Business Reference and Services Section (ALA BRASS) by being named to the association's list of "Outstanding Business Reference Sources: The 2010 Selection of Recent Titles". The categories of business and economics open textbooks from Flat World Knowledge's catalog were selected for this award and referenced as "an innovative new vehicle for affordable (or free) online access to premier instructional resources in business and economics." Specific criteria used by the American Library Association BRASS when evaluating titles for selection were:

A resource compiled specifically to supply information on a certain subject or group of subjects in a form that will facilitate its ease of use. The works are examined for authority and reputation of the publisher, author, or editor; accuracy; appropriate bibliography; organization, comprehensiveness, and value of the content; currency and unique addition to the field; ease of use for intended purpose; quality and accuracy of indexing; and quality and usefulness of graphics and illustrations. Each year more electronic reference titles are published, and additional criteria by which these resources are evaluated include search features, stability of content, graphic design quality, and accuracy of links. Works selected are intended to be suitable for medium to large academic and public libraries.

The Text and Academic Author's Association awarded a 2011 Textbook Excellence Award ("Texty") to the first open textbook to ever win such recognition in that year. A maximum of eight academic titles could earn this award each year. The title "Organizational Behavior" by Talya Bauer and Berrin Erdogan earned one of seven 2011 Textbook Excellence Awards granted. Bauer & Erdogan's "Organizational Behavior" open textbook was published by Flat World Knowledge.

Other significant honors can be found via Open Education Global—a community that presents annual awards for innovation and leadership in open education.

In 2024, the Society for Glycobiology gave the consortium of editors of the open-access textbook Essentials of Glycobiology its Distinguished Service Award, citing the book's free and online availability as a major accomplishment in spreading awareness and interest in the field of glycobiology.

== Instruction ==
Open textbooks are flexible in ways that traditional textbooks are not, which gives instructors more freedom to use them in the way that best meets their instructional needs.

One common frustration with traditional textbooks is the frequency of new editions, which force the instructor to modify the curriculum to the new book. Any open textbook can be used indefinitely, so instructors need only change editions when they think it is necessary.

Many open textbooks are licensed to allow modification. This means that instructors can add, remove or alter the content to better fit a course's needs. Furthermore, the cost of textbooks can in some cases contribute to the quality of instruction when students are not able to purchase required materials. A Florida governmental panel found after substantial consultation with educators, students, and administrators that "there are compelling academic reasons to use open access textbooks such as: improved quality, flexibility and access to resources, interactive and active learning experiences, currency of textbook information, broader professional collaboration, and the use of teaching and learning technology to enhance educational experiences." (OATTF, p. i)

== Authorship ==
Author compensation for open textbooks works differently than traditional textbook publishing. By definition, the author of an open textbook grants the public the right to use the textbook for free, so charging for access is no longer possible. However, numerous models for supporting authors are developing. For example, a startup open textbook publisher called Flat World Knowledge pays its authors royalties on the sale of print copies and study aids. Other proposed models include grants, institutional support and advertising.

== American legislation ==
Legislation "to authorize grants for the creation, update, or adaption of open textbooks" and assure those developed would be made available under favorable licenses was introduced into the 111th United States Congress, both in the Senate and the House of Representatives. Findings specific to open textbooks detailed in the bill text are:

1. The growth of the Internet has enabled the creation and sharing of open content, including open educational resources.
2. The U.S. President has proposed a new, significant federal investment in the creation of online open-source courses for community colleges that will make learning more accessible, adaptable, and affordable for students.
3. The high cost of college textbooks continues to be a barrier for many students in achieving higher education, and according to the Advisory Committee on Student Financial Assistance, 200,000 qualified students fail to enroll in college each year due to cost.
4. The College Board reported that for the 2007–2008 academic year an average student spent an estimated $805 to $1,229 on college books and supplies.
5. Making high quality open textbooks freely available to the general public could significantly lower college textbook costs and increase accessibility to such education materials.
6. Open textbooks can improve learning and teaching by creating course materials that are more flexible, adaptable, and accessible through the use of technology.

This legislation did not reach the floor of either chamber for debate or vote prior to the conclusion of the 111th Congress.

After this initial foray into legislation supporting OER in higher education, the U.S. Congress funded an Open Textbook Pilot Program in 2018. As of 2021, funding had been renewed every year. In 2021, $7 million was awarded to nine projects nationwide.

== Industry opposition ==
The current higher education textbook industry has voiced stiff opposition to creation and adoption of open textbooks. The industry is represented by Bruce Hildebrand, a former senior vice president from the controversial firm Hill & Knowlton International Public Relations, who is now acting as executive director for higher education for the Association of American Publishers.

== Accessibility ==
As institutions moved toward digital access during the COVID-19 pandemic, accessibility of course materials became a mounting concern. Specifically, accessibility for people with disabilities has been a challenge across resources including open textbooks. Web accessibility is defined by W3C as adherence to Web Content Accessibility Guidelines (WCAG). Studies have increasingly shown that open textbooks fail multiple criteria outlined in WCAG. These studies have caused the open education community to produce guides for improving the accessibility of open textbooks and OER.

== Projects and initiatives ==
A number of projects and initiatives around the world seek to develop, support and promote open textbooks. Two very notable advocates and supporters of open textbook and related open education projects include the William and Flora Hewlett Foundation and the Bill and Melinda Gates Foundation.

=== Australian Open Textbook Project ===
The Australian Open Textbook Project is investigating the current and potential role of open textbooks in Australian higher education. The project has a particular focus on social justice and is funded by the National Centre for Student Equity in Higher Education (NCSEHE).

=== BCcampus ===
BCcampus supports online college and university education in British Columbia (BC), Canada. In 2012 BCcampus was awarded the first in a series of provincial funds from the BC Ministry of Advanced Education to support the use and development of open textbooks in British Columbia, including the creation of open textbooks in popular subjects. BCcampus provides a library of curated open textbooks and extensive support for open textbook development.

=== Digital Open Textbooks for Development (DOT4D) ===
The DOT4D project is based at The University of Cape Town and funded by the Canadian International Development Research Centre (IDRC). The project focuses on supporting the use of open textbook use in South African higher education. DOT4D has a particular focus on social justice.

=== eCampus Ontario ===
eCampus Ontario is a Canadian non-governmental organisation (NGO). It supports the use of OER and partners with higher education institutions to support the development of open textbooks. eCampus Ontario also provide a curated collection of OER, including open textbooks.

=== OpenStax ===
OpenStax (formerly Connexions and OpenStax College) was founded in 2011 and is based at Rice University. As at June 2021 OpenStax provided 61 openly licensed, curriculum aligned textbooks for universities, colleges and high schools, largely available in US English but with some textbooks available in Polish. OpenStax has charitable status and is funded from a variety of sources, including foundation funding. During 2019 it was reported that OpenStax materials were being used by half of all higher education institutions in the United States.

=== Open Education Network ===
The Open Education Network (formerly the Open Textbook Network) is based at The University of Minnesota. A membership organisation, The Open Education Network supports the use of OER in Higher Education. The associated Open Textbook Library had curated 886 open textbooks for reuse as at June 2021.

=== Polish Coalition for Open Education (KOED) and the Polish Government ===
The KOED advocates for the use of OER in Poland. The work of KOED informed the Polish Government investment in open textbooks for use in primary and secondary education during 2012 and 2013. A range of open textbooks have been developed and made available.

=== Siyavula ===
Based in South Africa, Siyavula was founded in 2007 and offers high school maths and science open textbooks. Initially funded through a Shuttleworth Foundation fellowship, the South African government provided 2.5 million print copies of Siyavula textbooks to South African high school students during 2012.

=== UK Open Textbooks Project ===
The Hewlett Foundation funded UK Open Textbooks project (2017–2018) was a collaborative pilot project investigating the applicability of two methods of open textbook adoption to the UK context.

=== Universal Open Textbook Initiative ===
The Universal Open Textbook Initiative, founded in 2024, is an open textbook project that curates openly licensed textbooks and publishes translations of them in multiple languages.

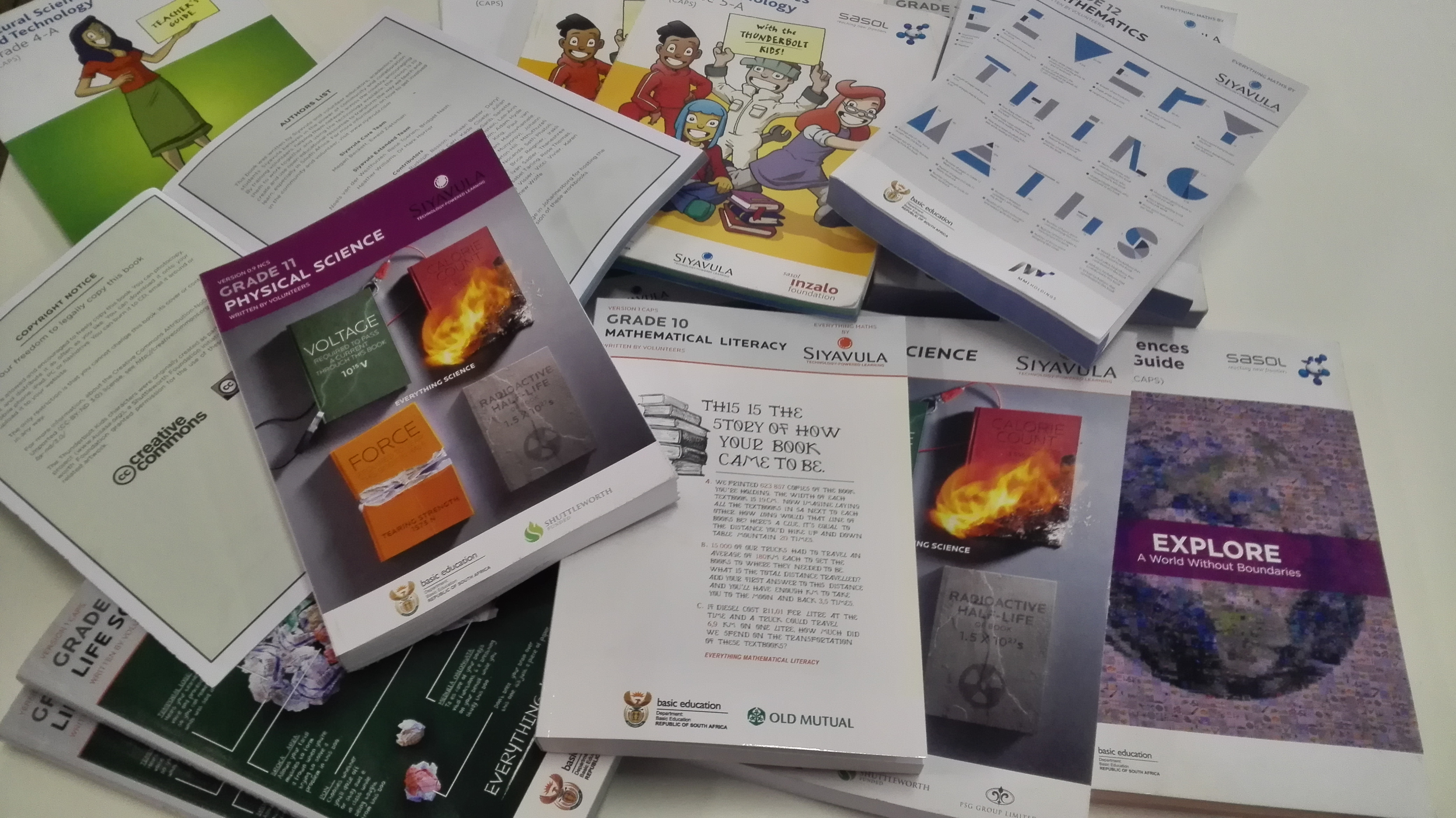
Siyavula Open Textbooks

== See also ==
- Open educational resources
- Open content
- Openness
- California Open Source Textbook Project
- Global Text
- CK-12 Foundation
- Free High School Science Texts
- OER Commons
- MIT OpenCourseWare
- WikiToLearn
- Wikibooks
