= INeedAPencil =

Non-profit

- Website type: Education
- Available in: American English
- Owner: Jason Shah
- Creator: Jason Shah
- Revenue: N/A
- Website: http://ineedapencil.ck12.org/
- Registration: Required for some services
- Launched: 2006

The INeedAPencil is a not-for-profit website created in 2006 by tutor Jason Shah, a graduate of Harvard University. The site supplies a free online collection of more than 60 lessons in math, reading, and writing that invoke pop culture to make them more entertaining. There are over 800 practice exam questions that simulate the SAT, and provide full explanations.

INeedAPencil was acquired in 2011 by CK-12 Foundation, an educational non-profit.

== See also ==
- College Board
- Educational Testing Service
- Standardized test
