= China Quality Course =

China Quality Course is a program launched by the Ministry of Education of the People's Republic of China since April 8, 2003.

This program accepts applications for university lecturers that wish to put their courses online and will award the lecturers approved. The most prestigious award is for the "National Level", followed by the "Provincial Level" and "School Level". The first group of "National Level" quality courses were about 150, which was announced on February 10, 2004. From 2003 to 2010, 3862 courses had been produced at the national level by 746 universities. According to the official website for the China Quality Course, the total number of courses available online is more than 20,000.
