= Notre Dame OpenCourseWare =

Publication of course materials from the University of Notre Dame

Notre Dame OpenCourseWare was an initiative by the University of Notre Dame to make materials from various courses freely available on the web. Launched September 30, 2006, the site hosted materials from 45 courses in seven subjects. The project was initially funded by a grant from the William and Flora Hewlett Foundation, and, unless indicated otherwise, all materials are released with a Creative Commons license. The site is no longer available.

Notre Dame OCW was recognized along with other universities as part of Reader's Digest's America's 100 Best Award in 2007.
