= Berkeley Webcast =

Educational podcast

Berkeley Webcast (also known as webcast.berkeley) is an initiative of the University of California, Berkeley developed by the Berkeley Multimedia Research Center (BMRC) to share video and audio of full undergraduate courses and on-campus events. Initial research at BMRC was aided by grants from the National Science Foundation. Under its initial name, the "Berkeley Internet Broadcasting System," the project delivered its first seminar webcast in January 1995, with the broadcast of regular courses beginning in the spring of 1999. The site now includes over 100 full courses available through streaming RealMedia video, streaming audio, MP3 download, and podcast, with availability of these different options varying by course and event.

Since the fall of 2007, all Berkeley Webcast materials have been assigned a Creative Commons Attribution-NonCommercial-NoDerivatives license by default, but faculty participants and content providers can license these recordings in a variety of ways. Berkeley has started to make select webcasts originally produced for the project available on select external services — iTunes U in 2006 and YouTube in 2007. Before being uploaded on YouTube, in 2006 alone, lectures had been viewed 4.3 million times on their local host at webcast.berkeley.

The project was awarded the 2002 Larry L. Sautter Award for Innovation and Entrepreneurship in Information Technology.
