= CK-12 Foundation =

California-based non-profitable organization

Coordinates: 37°26′6.11″N 122°6′34.59″W

CK12 Foundation
- Founded: 2007
- Founders: Neeru Khosla and Murugan Pal
- Purpose: Education technology
- Location: Palo Alto, California
- Region served: Global
- Method: Donations and Grants
- Key people: Neeru Khosla, executive director Murugan Pal, President; Miral Shah, CTO
- Website: https://www.ck12.org

The CK-12 Foundation is a California-based non-profit organization which aims to increase access to low-cost K-12 education in the United States and abroad. CK-12 provides free and customizable K-12 open educational resources aligned to state curriculum standards. As of August 2026, the organization's website reported that its platform had served more than 453 million users, customized 371K FlexBooks, and answered more than 2.88 billion questions.

CK-12 was set up to support K-12 Science, Technology, Engineering, and Math (STEM) education. It first produced content via a web-based platform called "FlexBook."

== History ==
CK-12 was established in 2007 by Neeru Khosla and Murugan Pal as a not-for-profit educational organization. Teacher-generated content was initially made available under Creative Commons Attribution licenses so as to make it simpler, easier, and more affordable for children to access educational resources. However, they later switched to a Creative Commons Non Commercial licence, and then to their own "CK-12" license.

Originally, the "C" in CK-12 stood for "connect", indicating that the material was the missing connection in K-12 education. Subsequently, it took on a more open meaning, variously standing for "content, classroom, customizable, connections, collaboration".

In 2010, NASA teamed up with CK-12 to produce physics-related resources.

In March 2013, Microsoft announced a partnership with CK-12 to provide content to Microsoft's Windows 8 customers.

== FlexBook System ==
The foundation's FlexBook website permits the assembly and creation of downloadable educational resources, which can be customized to meet classroom needs. Some FlexBooks are also available in Spanish and Hindi. Content is offered under the CK-12 Curriculum Materials License. Readers should consult the linked license for an understanding of the license. Materials are available in various formats.

== Approach ==
The CK-12 Foundation's approach to supporting education in schools is through concept-based learning, including lessons, videos, interactives, real-world applications, study guides, and adaptive practice.

== Other products ==
The CK-12 Foundation also offers the following online resources and tools for students and educators:

- Flexi, a free AI-powered student tutor for math and science integrated with FlexBook 2.0. It provides hints, answers, and personalized lessons using CK-12 content, accepts typed questions or images of problems, and incorporates real-world examples, interactive simulations, and videos. It is also available as an iPhone and iPad app and supports test preparation.
- Flexi Teacher Assistant, a suite of AI-powered tools for educators supporting lesson planning, assessment creation, differentiated instruction, and the adaptation of learning materials such as reading passages, accommodation plans, science labs, and family newsletters.
- CK-12 Braingenie - a repository of math and science practice materials.
- CK-12 FlexMath - an interactive, year-long Algebra 1 curriculum.
- CK-12 INeedAPencil - a free SAT preparation website, founded in 2007 by then high school student, Jason Shah.

== Recognition ==
- CK-12 has been listed in the Top 25 Websites for Teaching by American Association of School Librarians
- The National Tech Plan - The Office of Educational Technology, U.S. Department of Education – has mentioned the CK-12 model as “Transforming American Education – Learning Powered by Technology”
- Tech Awards-2010 listed CK-12 in “15 innovations that could save the world”
- In introducing Washington state bill, HB 2337: “Regarding open educational resources in K-12 education,” Representative Reuven Carlyle testifies to the benefit CK-12 materials can have for school districts around the country.
- Fortune Magazine described CK-12 as a threat to the traditional textbook industry, and wrote about CK-12's push towards concept-based learning.
- National Public Radio writes about CK-12, including its use of "Real World Applications" as teaching devices.
- Neeru and CK-12 have been featured in the New York Times, the Gates Notes, Mercury News, TechCrunch, Education Week, EduKindle, The Patriot News, Getting Smart, and Teachinghistory.org
