= FlatWorld =

American textbook publisher

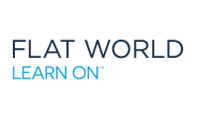
- Formerly: Flat World Knowledge
- Type: Private
- Industry: Education
- Founded: 2007
- Headquarters: Boston, Massachusetts, United States
- Area served: Global
- Key people: Alastair Adam, Co-CEO; John Eielson, Co-CEO
- Products: Textbooks
- Website: catalog.flatworldknowledge.com

FlatWorld is a publisher of college-level textbooks and educational supplements. The company was founded in 2007 as Flat World Knowledge by Eric Frank and Jeff Shelstad.

== History ==
In 2007, Flat World Knowledge was founded by Jeff Shelstad and Eric Frank in Nyack, New York. By August 2009, Flat World textbooks had been adopted at 400 colleges for use by 40,000 students. In 2010, Flat World Knowledge moved from Nyack to Irvington, New York. It had been adopted by more than 1,300 educators as of that year.

The company received $8 million in funding from investors in 2010. In January 2011, the company received an additional $15 million in funding from investors.

The company originally offered every textbook published free using online delivery under the open content paradigm, but in November 2012, the company announced that it would no longer offer free access to textbooks.

In late 2016, Flat World Knowledge was acquired by Alastair Adam and John Eielson and rebranded as FlatWorld.

== See also ==
- OpenCourseWare
- Open educational resources
- Open textbook
- Wikibooks
