= China Open Resources for Education =

CORE was established in November 2003 following an MIT OpenCourseWare Conference in Beijing.

CORE was a consortium of universities that began with 26 IET Educational Foundation member universities and 44 China Radio and TV Universities, with a total enrollment of 5 million students. It aimed to provide Chinese universities with free and easy access to global open educational resources and provided a framework for Chinese-speaking universities to participate in the shared global network of advanced courseware with MIT and other leading universities.

== Lead universities ==
- Beijing Jiaotong University
- Central South University
- Dalian University of Technology
- Harbin Institute of Technology
- Nanjing University
- Peking University
- Shanghai Jiaotong University
- Sichuan University
- Tsinghua University
- Xi'an Jiaotong University
- Open University of China

== See also ==
- Higher education in China
