= Bookboon =

Digital learning service provider

Bookboon Learning
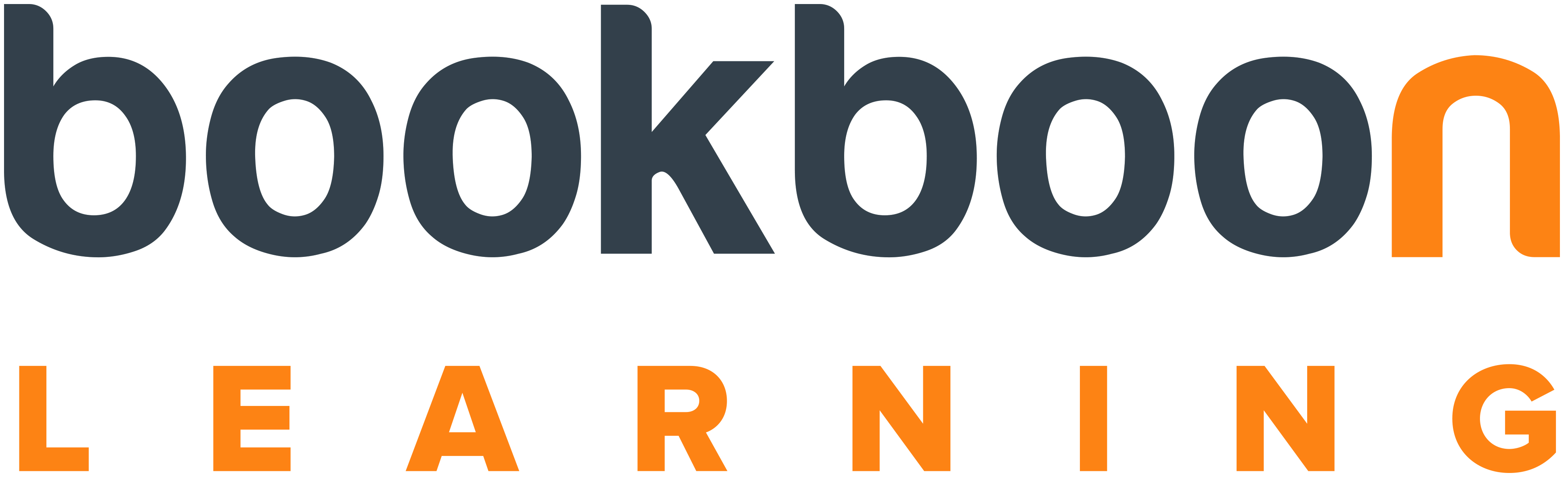
- Company type: Online, private company
- Website type: Digital learning services
- Available in: Multilingual
- Founded: 1988 (as Ventus Publishing)
- Headquarters: Copenhagen, Denmark London, United Kingdom
- No. of locations: 2 international locations
- Area served: Worldwide
- Key people: Kristian Buus Madsen; (CEO); Thomas Buus Madsen; (COO)
- Industry: eBook Publishing, Learning & Development
- Products: eBooks, Audio learning, Online courses, Online learning subscription, Corporate learning & development, Team learning
- Services: Personal development, Soft skills development
- Advertising: Yes
- Registration: Required for reading books
- Launched: 2005
- Current status: Active

Bookboon Learning is a digital learning service provider for corporate learning & development, providing eBooks, audio learning, online courses & learning.

Bookboon was originally founded in Denmark in 1988 under the name Ventus. Today, Bookboon operates globally with offices in London and Copenhagen.

Bookboon offers free university textbooks to students and content, focus lies on soft skills and personal development for bite-sized learning for professionals.

== History ==
Bookboon started as a family business named Ventus in 1988 in Denmark. At that time, Ventus focused on publishing student textbooks. The owners of Ventus had two sons named Thomas Buus Madsen and Kristian Buus Madsen. In 2005, the two brothers took control of Ventus and in 2008 they renamed the company Bookboon. The advertisers were companies looking to promote their career opportunities towards students and professionals.

In 2006, the company expanded its business model to Sweden, followed by Germany and the Netherlands in 2007. In 2008, Bookboon expanded its operations to the United Kingdom and started publishing eBooks in English.

In 2016, Bookboon was highlighted for its activities on the African continent, especially in terms of offering free textbooks for students based on employer branding. This was reported by the Danish newspaper business.dk, the German international public broadcaster Deutsche Welle as well as CNBC South Africa.
