= National Programme on Technology Enhanced Learning =

Indian e-learning platform

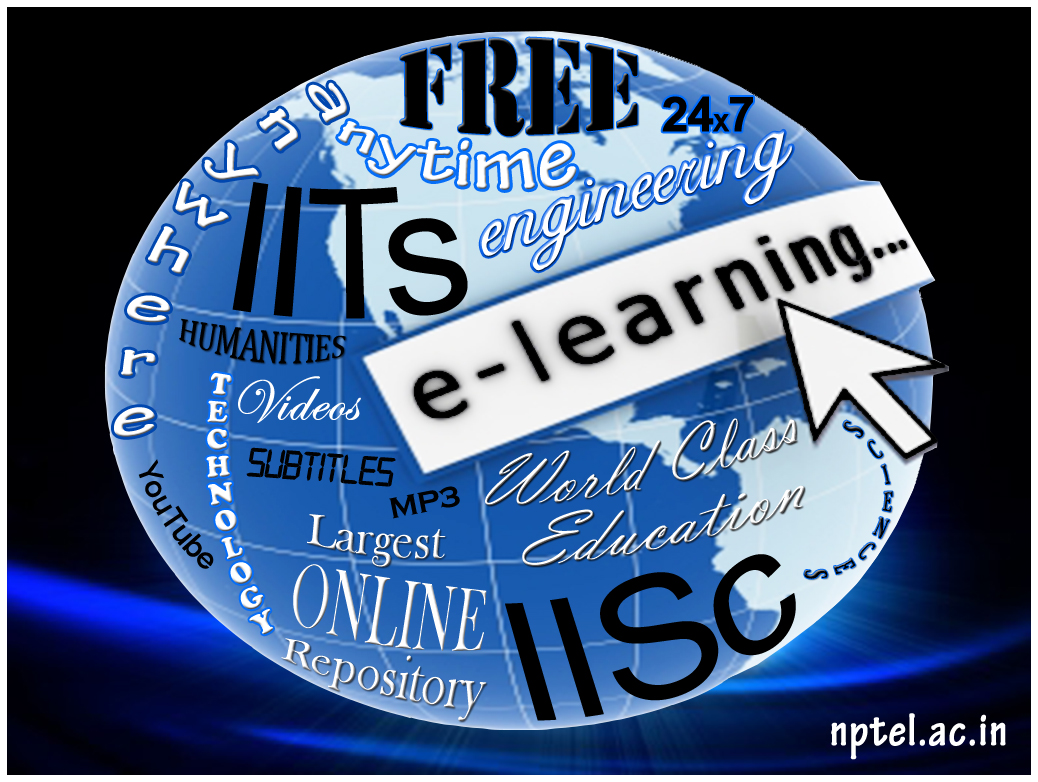
- Location: IIT Madras, Chennai, Tamil Nadu, India
- Established: 2003; 23 years ago

Other information
- Website: nptel.ac.in

The National Programme on Technology Enhanced Learning, abbreviated as NPTEL, is an Indian e-learning platform for university-level science, technology, engineering, and mathematics (STEM) subjects. NPTEL is the largest e-repository in the world of courses in engineering, basic sciences and selected humanities and management subjects. The platform and materials have been jointly developed by Indian Institutes of Technology (IITs) and Indian Institute of Science.

The initiative is funded by the central Ministry of Education. The project's central idea is to put recorded lectures taught by its member institutes online for open access. It operates an educational YouTube channel covering engineering, basic sciences, and some humanities and social science subjects. Popular NPTEL courses are being translated into popular local languages. The local languages which the translation are available in include Assamese, Bengali, Gujarati, Hindi, Kannada, Malayalam, Marathi, Odia, Punjabi, Tamil and Telugu.

== History ==
NPTEL was launched in 2003 by seven IITs: Bombay, Delhi, Kanpur, Kharagpur, Madras, Guwahati and Roorkee, in conjunction with the Indian Institute of Science (IISc). The students who did not have the same background and training, found the courses hard to follow. NPTEL was then restructured to offer customized massive open online courses (MOOCs) with exams. In March 2014, NPTEL began offering courses along with in-centre and proctored certification examinations. These NPTEL online certification (NOC) courses are offered twice a year (Jan-Jun, Jul-Dec).

== Certificates and assessments ==
The NPTEL has adopted the MOOC (Massive open online course) model so that students outside IIT system can also participate in learning quality content and get certified, provided they meet the assessment criteria in the exams conducted at the end of the NPTEL semesters. All courses are free to enrol and learn from. The certification exam is optional and comes at a fee of ₹1,000 per course exam. Course credits can also be transferred to other higher education institutions student or the Academic Bank of Credits under the UGC guidelines. NPTEL courses aim for equitable access. They intended to be available, irrespective of location. Students in non-urban and rural areas can also study via supplementary DVDs and mobile delivered content. NPTEL exams can be written by students no matter where they are located. Assessments take place either at an exam site, or via remote proctoring. Plagiarism Detection Software, known as ShodhShuddhi, assists Universities/Institutions with addressing academic integrity matters.

The headquarters of NPTEL is located inside IIT Madras.
