= Curriki =

Online, free, open education service

- Formation: March 2004; 22 years ago
- Type: Nonprofit
- Legal status: 501(c)(3)
- Website: curriki.org

Curriki is an online, free, open education service. Curriki is structured as a nonprofit organization to provide open educational resources primarily in support of K-12 education. Curricula and instructional materials are available at the Curriki website to teachers, professional educators, students, lifelong learners, and parents. The majority of the resources on the Curriki site fall under a Creative Commons license. Educational materials are provided by the Curriki community and are peer-reviewed for quality and adherence to standards.

The name Curriki is a portmanteau of the words "curriculum" and "wiki".

Curriki's model is to develop curricula through community contributors, and to deliver curricula and open educational resources globally. Anyone with access to the Internet can contribute and use the material found on Curriki to teach themselves or others. Since the materials, which include digital textbooks, learning videos, and interactive resources, are provided in open source, they can be adapted as needed to particular requirements inside or outside of the classroom.

== History ==
Curriki was founded by Sun Microsystems in March 2004 as the Global Education & Learning Community (GELC). In 2006, Sun spun GELC off as an independent 501(c)(3) nonprofit to focus on building a repository of curricula and to create an online community for this repository. The organization changed its name to Curriki in 2006.

Curriki has over 350,000 educator, parent, and student members, and has garnered over 8.5 million visits from around the world. Curriki has received a number of awards, and has also given out a number of awards over the past several years; a partial list can be found at the Curriki website. Kim Jones co-founded Curriki with Scott McNealy, a founder of Sun Microsystems.

In September 2017, Curriki partnered with AT&T in order to come up with interactive math assessments tools, with which students would be given real-time feedback.
