= Community College Consortium for Open Educational Resources =

American educational organization

- Community College Consortium for Open Educational Resources
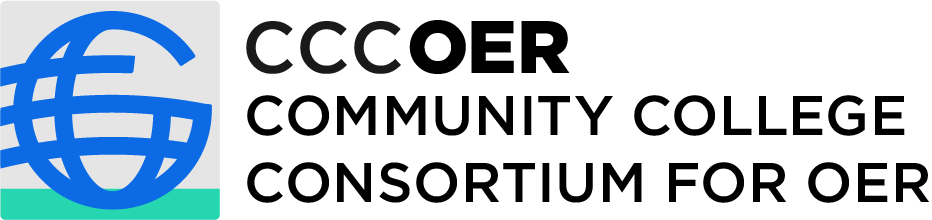
- Formation: 2007
- Founder: Martha Kanter
- Director: Una Daly
- Parent organization: Open Education Global

The Community College Consortium for Open Educational Resources (CCCOER) promotes the awareness of open educational policies, practices, and resources. CCCOER is part of Open Education Global. CCCOER describes itself as a community of practice for open education, providing various resources, support, and opportunities for collaboration for learning, planning, and implementing successful open educational programs at community colleges and technical colleges. This support includes webinars, online advocacy events and conferences, a community email list, community blog, workshops and presentations throughout North America, as well as generally raising awareness of open education and supporting the needs of students and faculty at colleges adopting open educational resources and full degree pathways.

== History ==
CCCOER was established in 2007 at the Foothill–De Anza Community College District by then Chancellor Dr. Martha Kanter. From 2007 to 2011, CCCOER's efforts focused on the College Open Textbooks Collaborative hosted at the Foothill–De Anza College District. This project involved a train-the-trainer network of community college faculty and administrators, a catalog of over 750 open textbooks, and research on open educational resources (OER) impact on students and faculty at community colleges.

In 2008, CCCOER collaborated with Rice University's Connexions, now called OpenStax CNX, to address the high cost and limitations of traditional publisher textbooks with a proof of concept open textbook.

In 2011, CCCOER became part of the Open Education Consortium (OEC), which is now Open Education Global. CCCOER was the first community college system to join OEC. In 2011, CCCOER also partnered with the OpenCourseWare (OCW) Consortium, to maximize and expand the impact of OCW to community college students, faculty, and learners.

CCCOER includes membership of institutions and organizations that support openness, equity, and access in education. As of June 2021, CCCOER membership includes 93 members across 35 U.S. states and Canadian provinces.

== See also ==
- Open educational resources, freely accessible, openly licensed materials used for teaching, learning, and assessing.
