= Martha Kanter =

United States Department of Education official

Martha J. Kanter is the former Under Secretary of Education. She was appointed by President Barack Obama on April 29, 2009, and confirmed by the Senate on June 19, 2009.

She served as chancellor of the Foothill–De Anza Community College District and established the first program for students with learning disabilities at San Jose City College. In 2007, she additionally founded the Community College Consortium for Open Educational Resources (CCCOER), which promotes the awareness and adoption of open educational policies, practices, and resources. Kanter has a Bachelor of Arts from Brandeis University, a Master of Education from Harvard University, and a Doctor of Education from the University of San Francisco.

As the US Under Secretary of Education, Kanter oversaw policies, programs, and activities related to post-secondary education, vocational and adult education, and federal student aid, as well as continue to promote open educational resources (OER). Kanter announced on August 13, 2013, she would be stepping down from her Obama administration post.

She currently leads College Promise, American non-partisan non-profit initiative to increase college access, affordability, quality, and completion in American higher education. She also is a senior fellow at New York University’s Steinhardt Institute for Higher Education Policy. The College Promise initiative was started in Obama administration in 2015.
