= National Science Digital Library =

The logo of the National Science digital library

National Science Digital Library (NSDL) of the United States is an open-access online digital library and collaborative network of disciplinary and grade-level focused education providers operated by the Institute for the Study of Knowledge Management in Education. NSDL's mission is to provide quality digital learning collections to the science, technology, engineering, and mathematics (STEM) education community, both formal and informal, institutional and individual. NSDL's collections are refined by a network of STEM educational and disciplinary professionals. Their work is based on user data, disciplinary knowledge, and participation in the evolution of digital resources as major elements of effective STEM learning.

Resource types available via NSDL include instructional materials, activities, lesson plans, audio/video materials, images, web sites, simulations, visualizations, tools, and services. NSDL also provides annotation collection and paradata (usage data) collections: comments, ratings, or usage information attached to existing resources in the NSDL.

== Activities ==
- Learning Registry: The NSDL is a partner in the national Learning Registry project to facilitate the exchange of resources, metadata about resources, and paradata about their use in learning environments. NSDL is contributing to this multi-agency federal project designed to make learning resources produced by federal funding more accessible.
- NSDL STEM Exchange: concept for a web service to capture and share social media-generated information and other networked associations about educational resources (tagged, recommended, commented, discussed, clicked, viewed, downloaded, favorited, shared, etc.)
- Learning Application Readiness: an NSDL initiative that refers to how closely educational resources, collections, and their related metadata are aligned to educational goals, curriculum, or professional development needs of users, and how readily those can be embedded in tools and services that teachers and students use.
- Repositioning NSDL for the Next Generation of Digital Learning: An NSDL NSF-funded project building on and leveraging the lessons of prior work (NSDL network partners collaborations;; Learning Registry collaboration; ; Common Core Mathematics collection) to bring pilot level projects to scale and to integrate new STEM education services into NSDL. These efforts contribute to NSDL's sustainability through diffusion and adoption of resources into a wider range of instructional settings and teacher peer-to-peer networks.

=== Former Projects ===
- The NSDL operated the NuclearFiles.org website (Division of Undergraduate Education), which was online from late 1990s to 2023. The project was also associated with the Nuclear Age Peace Foundation.

== History ==
The National Science Digital Library (NSDL) was established in 2000 by the National Science Foundation (NSF) to provide an organized point of access to STEM content aggregated from a variety of other digital libraries, NSF-funded projects, and other national STEM stakeholder providers. Key collaborations with disciplinary communities and audience-focused providers grew out of the NSDL, providing a social and technical infrastructure for collaboration in the delivery and use of digital resources in STEM education. NSDL also provides access to services and tools that enhance the use of this content in a variety of contexts. NSDL is designed primarily for K-16 educators, but anyone can access NSDL.org and search the library at no cost, and without creating a user account, although some content providers require a nominal fee or subscription to retrieve their specific resources.

From 2000 – 2011, the National Science Foundation sponsored an NSDL grant-making program in the Division of Undergraduate Education (DUE) of the Education and Human Resources Directorate. The National STEM Distributed Learning (NSDL) program offered grants to support major collection-building efforts, services development, and targeted research that built and extended library services. In February 2011, the NSF ended the NSDL grant-making program in DUE, and did not issue an NSDL program solicitation for FY2011.

Originally a collaboration between Cornell University, Columbia University, and the University Corporation for Atmospheric Research (UCAR), the NSDL became entirely hosted at UCAR, in Boulder, Colorado. In 2014, the NSDL was transferred to the Institute for the Study of Knowledge Management in Education, and incorporated into the OER Commons as a Hub in 2024.

== See also ==
- Analytical Sciences Digital Library
