= Institute for the Study of Knowledge Management in Education =

American non-profit organization

- Formation: 2002
- Legal status: Non-profit
- Headquarters: Half Moon Bay, California
- Website: www.iskme.org

The Institute for the Study of Knowledge Management in Education (ISKME) is a 501(c)(3) non-profit organization founded in 2002. Located in Half Moon Bay, California, its mission is to make learning and knowledge sharing participatory, equitable, and open.

The institute supports open education research, field-building and leadership development, platform and tools development, library and information science, and an innovation and design lab. It hosts an annual conference that highlights work in the field.

== History ==
ISKME was established in 2002 by Lisa Petrides, at the time a professor in Teachers College at Columbia University. The institute's initial research focused on the how open data and knowledge management could inform decision making by college faculty and administrators and by the philanthropic sector.

It's early research included a study for grantmakers in education on the sharing of data and information among foundations, and a landscape survey of knowledge management in education.

In 2004, with support from the William and Flora Hewlett Foundation, ISKME expanded to include research and training in the development of open educational resources, and helped disseminate the idea of open educational resources as its own category of learning materials.

In 2007, ISKME launched OER Commons, a digital repository of open teaching and learning resources, which became one of the largest collections of English-language classroom resources. That year, Petrides was one of 27 authors of the 2007 Cape Town Open Education Declaration. This declaration laid the groundwork for other international open educational resources policy agreements, including the Recommendation on Open Educational Resources adopted, with the support of ISKME, by UNESCO's General Conference at its 40th session in 2019.

In 2009, the institute hosted its inaugural Big Ideas Fest, an annual conference held in Half Moon Bay. The event has been sponsored by public television station KQED and Roadtrip Nation, and by the Gates Foundation.

In 2014, OER Commons developed one of its first microsites when it began managing the National Science Digital Library. It also supports other hubs and resource centers from individual source libraries.

=== Partners ===
Starting in 2004, ISKME partnered with organizations developing new materials under open licenses, including the Monterey Institute of Technology, Connexions, Teachers Domain, Free High School Science Texts, Siyavula in South Africa, and Training Commons in India. In 2005, the institute worked with teacher training bodies including the San Francisco School Alliance and Berkeley's Principal Leadership Institute.

By 2010, the institute was supporting state and national initiatives and UNESCO projects with a range of open education services. Later projects include the 2013 Open Book Project in the Middle East, championed by Secretary of State Hillary Clinton and Undersecretary of Education Martha Kanter, and UNESCO's ICT Competency Framework for Teachers. The Institute helped the U.S. Office of Educational Technology launch its #GoOpen initiative in 2018, engaging a national dialogue about open resources in K-12 education. ISKME later took over the initiative.

Other partners that have jointly developed online resources in K-12 and higher education include OpenStax, NAACP, the Arab League Educational, Cultural and Scientific Organization (ALECSO), and the American Association of Colleges and Universities (AAC&U).

== Awards ==
ISKME was named an Education Laureate by the San Jose Tech Museum of Innovation in 2007 for OER Commons. In December 2010, it was named a finalist in the Qatar Foundation World Innovation Summit for Education (WISE) Awards for its OER Commons teacher professional development programs.

In 2011, ISKME won the Award for Bodies which Influence Policy from the Open Educational Quality Initiative (OPAL), a consortium that includes UNESCO, the International Council for Open and Distance Education, the European Foundation for Quality in e-Learning, and several European universities. In 2011 ISKME announced a matching grant from the Bill and Melinda Gates Foundation to support the Big Ideas in Beta program, focused on incubating innovation in education.

In 2017, the American Association of School Librarians recognized ISKME's OER Commons as one of the nation's best websites for teaching and learning.

== See also ==
- Open educational practices
- Open educational resources
