= DOBA Faculty of Applied Business and Social Studies Maribor =

DOBA Faculty of Applied Business and Social Studies Maribor, Slovenia, Europe
- DOBA Fakulteta za uporabne poslovne in družbene študije Maribor
- Type: Private Business School
- Established: 2003
- Dean: Dr. Rasto Ovin
- Students: 778 (in study year 2014/15)
- Location: Maribor, Slovenia
- Campus: Urban
- Affiliations: EDEN, BUSINET, CQI, CEEMAN, ECQA, Knowledge Economy Network (KEN), ECSB
- Website: www.eng.doba.si

DOBA Faculty of Applied Business and Social Studies (Slovene: DOBA Fakulteta za uporabne poslovne in družbene študije) is a private business school located in Maribor, Slovenia. Founded in 2003, DOBA Faculty provides undergraduate and graduate education in economics, business management, marketing and management.

== Overview ==
DOBA Faculty of applied business and social studies is a private business school from Slovenia. It grew out from the existing secondary and high school which were amongst the first private educational institutions in Slovenia. Currently the faculty offers undergraduate and graduate courses and operates in Slovenia, Serbia, Croatia and Kenya. Courses are attended mostly on-line establishing DOBA Faculty as the largest online distance education provider in Slovenia. It also offers traditional classes in Maribor. DOBA Faculty's has been awarded UNIQUe certification by EFQUEL for its use of ICT in teaching and learning. DOBA Faculty participates in Erasmus Programme, an EU framework for the European co-operation activities of higher education institutions.

=== History ===
DOBA Faculty was founded in Maribor in 2003 when it received approval from the Council of the Republic of Slovenia for Higher Education for the formation of the new college. Between 2003 and 2007 it was offering bachelor study programmes in business studies. In 2007 it has received approval for teaching master programmes. Since 2003 DOBA Faculty has expanded to other countries of South East Europe, first to Serbia, then to Croatia. It offers undergraduate and graduate courses for which lessons, consultations and other communication between the faculty, its staff and students are performed via distance e-learning methods.

=== Management ===
The dean of the DOBA Faculty is dr. Rasto Ovin. The director of the DOBA Faculty is Mrs. Jasna Dominko Baloh.

=== Academics and faculty ===
DOBA Faculty's undergraduate and graduate programs are in full compliance with the Bologna Process; its undergraduate program is worth 180 ECTS points, while its master's degrees are worth 120 ECTS points. It is fully accredited and recognized by the Slovenian ministry for higher education, science and technology. Over the time Doba Faculty expanded its teaching programmes offering undergraduate courses in Business Management, Marketing, Business Administration, Organisation and Management of Social Activities and Management of Lifelong Education, while master programmes have courses in International Business Management, Organization and Management of Social Activities and Management of Lifelong Education. DOBA Faculty has awarded 2972 degrees in its first 11 years of activity

=== Campus ===
The faculty is located in Maribor Prešernova ulica 1, 2000 Maribor, Slovenia. The school has hundreds of students in countries of former Yugoslavia who study online.
