= Open university (disambiguation) =

An open university is a university with an open-door academic policy.

Open University may also refer to specific institutions:

- The Open University (OU), a public distance-learning and research university based in the United Kingdom
- Open University of Diversity, headquarters of Belgian artist Koen Vanmechelen
- Open University Press, an academic publisher now owned by McGraw-Hill Education
- Sex Worker Advocacy and Resistance Movement, formerly known as Sex Worker Open University

== See also ==
- List of open universities
- Open College (disambiguation)
