= Framework for authentic intellectual work =

The Framework for Authentic Intellectual Work (AIW) is an evaluative tool used by educators of all subjects at the elementary and secondary levels to assess the quality of classroom instruction, assignments, and student work. The framework was founded by Dr. Dana L. Carmichael, Dr. M. Bruce King, and Dr. Fred M. Newmann. The purpose of the framework is to promote student production of genuine and rigorous work that resembles the complex work of adults, which identifies three main criteria for student learning (construction of knowledge, disciplined inquiry, and value beyond school), and provides standards accompanied by scaled rubrics for classroom instruction, assignments, and student work. The standards and rubrics are meant to support teachers in the promotion of genuine and rigorous work, as well as guide professional development and collaboration.

== Background ==
Authentic intellectual work refers to the complex work adults do to make informed decisions and accomplish tasks. It involves original application of knowledge and skills, rather than simply routine use of facts and procedures. This mainly lead for students having an authentic intellectual work results in a product or presentation that has meaning or value beyond the classroom.

The work that students perform in schools entails memorisation of facts and algorithms, and can fail to relate to the work they will need to do as an adult. The disconnect between the material studied at school and the skills needed to perform well in one's work, personal, or civic life can make school work seem meaningless or worthless. Learning tasks call for specific memorizes information, retrieval of given information, or application of routine computational procedures, but rarely do they call for higher-level thinking, interpretation, or in-depth conceptual understanding. Schoolwork is regarded largely as a series of contrived exercises necessary to earn credentials (grades, promotions) required for future success, but for many, especially poor students of color, this work leads to disengagement and dropping out. However, most jobs, personal matters and civic actions require problem-solving skills, in-depth understanding of problems and specific skills, and the ability to communicate in a variety of forms.

== The Framework ==
The framework aims to prepare students for the intellectual challenges of work, civic participation, and life by maximizing expectations for intellectual rigor for all students, encouraging in-depth understanding of content, and increasing student interest in academic work. This is made evident through its three main criteria for student learning which consist by construction of knowledge, disciplined inquiry, and value beyond school.

The construction of knowledge refers to solving problems by organizing, interpreting, evaluating or synthesizing prior knowledge. Disciplined inquiry involves gathering a knowledge base of relevant vocabulary, facts, concepts, algorithms, theories, and basic skills, gaining developing a deeper understanding by identifying, proposing, and testing relationships among key fact, events, concepts, rules, and claims. Finally, value beyond school acknowledges the necessity for students to present their knowledge in a variety of complex forms of communication to resemble real life work. To meet this criterion students use verbal, symbolic, graphic, and visual tools to explain, narrate, justify, and converse about a topic. The more each of these criteria, construction of knowledge, disciplined inquiry, and value beyond school, are met, the more “authentic” the work of the student.

== Summary of Research ==
From 1990 to 2003 researchers completed studies at Wisconsin Center for Education Research at the University of Wisconsin-Madison, the University of Minnesota, and the Consortium on Chicago School Research. The scoring rubrics described above were used to assess the quality of student work in (list demographics). Students who received higher levels of instruction and assessment showed higher achievement, both on direct assessments of authentic intellectual performance and on traditional standardized tests. Results were positive and consistent in grades 3-12 across different subject areas regardless of students’ race, gender, or socioeconomic status.

Their research was performed in response to their belief in a lack of rigor and relevance in educational reforms that encouraged the teaching of basic skills and ability to recall knowledge. Researchers believed low expectations existed for intellectual challenge, especially for students from typically disadvantaged backgrounds, along with a lack of student engagement, and an emphasis on breadth of knowledge rather than mastery.

Researchers argued that since cognitively integrated knowledge is more likely to be internalized and retained by students, it is more likely to be remembered and correctly applied on standardized tests than knowledge memorized as discrete items only for the purpose of repeating it when called upon. (27) Since demands for authentic intellectual work pose questions of interest to students in their lives beyond school, students are more likely to care about both the questions they study and the answers they learn. Thus, such assignments enhance a student's willingness to put forth serious effort in learning the material, as compared to exercises that have no personal meaning beyond completing an assignment to please the teacher or to attain a promotion. In sum, assignments that demand more authentic intellectual work elicit intensive thinking about and a deeper engagement in varied applications of words, concepts, and ideas. This can help students to internalize understandings as their own, and to use this knowledge to respond to items on conventional tests that may not have been explicitly covered in class.

== Standards for Scoring Rubrics ==
The framework provides standards for classroom instruction, assignments, and student work based on the three criteria for authentic intellectual work (construction of knowledge, disciplined inquiry, and value beyond school). Each standard is accompanied by a scoring rubric for evaluating a teacher's promotion of authentic intellectual work for their students in the classroom. Standardized rubrics provide teachers with a common language and vision for learning, can help teachers reflect on the practice, and become useful tools for professional development and collaboration. While the rubrics are meant to guide instruction to help teachers improve the authentic intellectual quality of student learning, they are not meant to be used as a comprehensive evaluative tool. They do not concern other aspects of teaching that may be valuable to schools.

=== Standards for Instruction ===
- Standard 1: Higher order thinking (HOT)

Students are required to manipulate information and ideas in ways that transform their meaning and implication. This occurs when students combine facts and ideas in order to synthesize, generalize, explain, hypothesize, or arrive at some conclusion or interpretation.

- Standard 2: Deep knowledge

Knowledge is deep when, instead of trying to learn or expressing only fragmented pieces of information, students encounter and express details, distinctions, nuances, and different applications of central concepts aimed toward integrated or holistic understandings.

- Standard 3: Substantive Conversation

Students engage in extended conversational exchanges with the teacher and/or their peers about subject matter in a way that builds an improved and shared understanding of ideas or topics.

Substantive conversation has three features:

1. talk is about subject matter in the discipline and includes higher order thinking;
2. the conversation includes sharing ideas and is not completely scripted or controlled by one party (as in teacher-led recitation);
3. the dialogue builds coherently on participants’ ideas to promote improved collective understanding of a theme or topic. This is called a sustained conversation.

Newman, Carmichael, and King (2007) identify a "sustained conversation" as having at least three consecutive interchanges between participants. The interchanges need not be between the same two people, but they must be linked substantively as consecutive responses.

- Standard 4: Connections to the world beyond the classroom

Students make connections between substantive knowledge and public problems or personal experiences they are likely to have faced or will face in the future. According to Newmann, Carmichael, and King (2007) lessons can have value for students school success by:

1. addressing an actual public problem of some contemporary significance
2. building on students’ personal experiences to teach important ideas in the disciplines
3. having students communicate their knowledge to others beyond the classroom in ways that assist or influence others.

=== Standards for Assignments ===
- Standard 1: Construction of Knowledge

The assignment asks students to organize and interpret information in addressing a concept, problem, or issue relevant to the discipline.

- Standard 2: Elaborated Written Communication

The assignment asks students to elaborate on their understanding, explanations, or conclusions through extended writing in the relevant discipline.

- Standard 3: Connection to Students’ Lives

The assignment asks students to address a concept, problem, or issue in the relevant discipline that is similar to one that they have encountered or are likely to encounter in their daily lives outside of school.

=== Standards for Evaluating Student Work ===
It is not as possible to tell whether student performance will have value beyond school. Therefore, the rubrics and standards for student work only reflect the first two criteria, construction of knowledge and disciplined inquiry.

- Standard 1: Construction of Knowledge (Analysis)

Student performance demonstrates thinking about disciplinary content through organizing, synthesizing, interpreting, hypothesizing, describing patterns, making models or simulations, constructing arguments, or considering alternative points of view.

- Standard 2: Disciplinary Concepts

Student performance demonstrates understanding of important disciplinary concepts central to the assignment.

- Standard 3: Elaborated Written Communication (discipline specific)

Student performance demonstrates an elaboration of his or her understanding or explanations of disciplinary concepts through extended writing.

- Standard 4: Elaborated Written Communication (writing)

Student performance demonstrates an elaborated, coherent account that draws conclusions or makes generalizations or arguments and supports them with examples, summaries, illustrations, details, or reasons.

== The challenges of Implementing AIW ==
Dr. Liz Winston for the Iowa Department of Education on the initial findings of the implementation of AIW in Iowa school districts, a major challenge for using the framework is the amount of time it requires for teacher training on the rubrics and foundational principles of the framework. Also, the framework is meant to be a collaborative tool that teachers use to give and receive feedback on their instruction and student work. This can be an unsatisfied experience for the teachers. It may take time to become accustomed to sustaining a focused dialogue that critiques teacher instruction and student work. The study also noted that the framework may be more useful in certain academic disciples. For example, an Iowa Math teacher commented that math students have many fundamental skills to learn first, and incorporating elaborated conversation is less natural for the math-learning environment. An Art teacher had similar feelings. Additionally, administrators mentioned AIW doesn't have a substantial amount of research behind it that supports its positive effects on students learning, which makes it more challenging to convince schools boards to fund its implementation. Finally, administrators also commented on the challenge they face keeping teachers motivated to continue having worthwhile dialogue centered around the rubrics once they become accustomed to the framework and the feedback sessions become routine.

== See also ==
- Authentic Assessment
- Authentic Learning
