= LWL =

LWL is a three-letter acronym which can mean:

- Landschaftsverband Westfalen-Lippe
- Living with ley
- Lifewide learning
- Load Waterline Length / Length at waterline
- La wea loca
