= Lisa Petrides =

- Education: University of California, Berkeley, Stanford University (PhD)
- Occupation: Education researcher

Lisa Ann Petrides is an American education researcher and the founder and CEO of the Institute for the Study of Knowledge Management in Education (ISKME). In 2007 she established OER Commons, a digital library and publishing platform for openly licensed teaching materials. She was previously a professor at Columbia University's Teachers College, and studies knowledge management and open educational resources.

== Education and career ==
Petrides has a BS from University of California, Berkeley, an MBA from Sonoma State University, and a Ph.D. in education from Stanford University. She was a professor at Teachers College, Columbia University, where her research addressed the use of information systems and institutional data in schools, including a collection of case studies on information technology in higher education.

In 2002, she founded ISKME to apply knowledge management research to educational institutions. That year she convened a Knowledge Management in Education summit that led to a landscape survey Knowledge Management in Education in 2003. A subsequent practitioner guide, Turning Knowledge into Action was published by the League for Innovation in the Community College in 2004.

=== OER Commons and advocacy ===
Petrides has advised UNESCO's work to advance OER, supporting the implementation of the UNESCO Recommendation on Open Educational Resources at its 40th session in 2019, and chairing a working group for its OER Dynamic Coalition. She has served as faculty for the Institute on Open Educational Resources of the Association of American Colleges and Universities.

In 2007, she developed the idea of an OER Commons, a digital library for educators to discover, evaluate, adapt and publish openly licensed course materials. With support from the Hewlett Foundation, this launched as an ISKME site, and would become one of its main projects. It focused initially on course materials and later open textbooks aligned with various curriculum standards for high schools, universities, and professional programs.

Later that year, Petrides was a drafter of the Cape Town Open Education Declaration, a significant international statement on open access, open education and open educational resources (OER). OER Commons was one of the first digital repositories exclusively dedicated to such resources, and would become one of ISKME's main projects. The site grew into a collaboration platform supporting community curation, publishing, and a catalog of 100,000 resources.

Since 2011, she has hosted an annual Big Ideas Fest in Half Moon Bay, which invites educators and policy makers in the United States to advance the movement for open educational resources.

== Research ==
Petrides's early work on teach with materials from the web addressed the rise of distance education and online coursework. Surveys of information technology use in the classroom and knowledge management in universities led her to start ISKME to focus on those topics.

After the development of Creative Commons licenses and an ecosystem of open educational resources, she studied how teachers in different countries and environments reuse educational resources, and how they improve them over time, with a focus on how openly licensed resources change that process of use and iteration.

In 2018 she published the CARE Framework (Contribute, Attribute, Release, Empower) for OER stewardship, with Douglas Levin and C. Edward Watson. This framework set out norms for organisations that make use of openly licensed materials to "hold each other to account". The framework prompted debate among open education researchers: David Wiley called it a "contribution to important conversations" while questioning whether its expectations were realistic for time-pressed faculty, and the economist Jim Luke devoted a chapter of the collection Open at the Margins to defending it, arguing that it was "a great start towards a community definition of our own Open Education Commons".

In 2024, Petrides and Christian Clauss began promoting the Open Metadata Exchange as a way to improve decentralized discovery of resources.

== Selected publications ==
- Petrides, Lisa A., ed. (2000). Case Studies on Information Technology in Higher Education: Implications for Policy and Practice. Hershey, PA: Idea Group Publishing. ISBN 978-1-878289-74-2.
- Petrides, Lisa A.; Guiney, Susan Zahra (2002). "Knowledge Management for School Leaders: An Ecological Framework for Thinking Schools". Teachers College Record 104 (8): 1702–1717. doi:10.1111/1467-9620.00217.
- Petrides, Lisa A. (2002). "Web-Based Technologies for Distributed (or Distance) Learning: Creating Learning-Centered Educational Experiences in the Higher Education Classroom". International Journal of Instructional Media 29 (1): 69–77.
- Petrides, Lisa A.; Nodine, Thad R. (2003). Knowledge Management in Education: Defining the Landscape. Half Moon Bay, CA: ISKME.
- Petrides, Lisa A.; McClelland, Sara I.; Nodine, Thad R. (2004). "Costs and benefits of the workaround". International Journal of Educational Management 18 (2): 100–108. doi:10.1108/09513540410522234.
- Petrides, Lisa; Nguyen, Lilly; Kargliani, Anastasia; Jimes, Cynthia (2008). "Open Educational Resources: Inquiring into Author Reuse Behaviors". Times of Convergence: Technologies Across Learning Contexts. Lecture Notes in Computer Science. Vol. 5192. pp. 344–353. doi:10.1007/978-3-540-87605-2_39.
- Petrides, Lisa; Jimes, Cynthia; Middleton-Detzner, Clare; Walling, Julie; Weiss, Shenandoah (2011). "Open textbook adoption and use: implications for teachers and learners". Open Learning 26 (1): 39–49.

== Personal life ==
Petrides has served on the Board of the San Mateo County Community College District since 2020. She is a senior fellow of the American Leadership Forum of Silicon Valley.
