= Authentic assessment =

Measurement of intellectual accomplishments

In education, authentic assessment is the measurement of "intellectual accomplishments that are worthwhile, significant, and meaningful". Authentic assessment can be devised by the teacher, or in collaboration with the student by engaging student voice. When applying authentic assessment to student learning and achievement, a teacher applies criteria related to “construction of knowledge, disciplined inquiry, and the value of achievement beyond the school.” Authentic assessment tends to focus on contextualised tasks, enabling students to demonstrate their competency in a more 'authentic' setting. According to Meg Ormiston, "Authentic learning mirrors the tasks and problem solving that are required in the reality outside of school."

This framework for assessment begins the same way curriculum design begins, with the question: What should students be able to do? Once the instructor answers that question, they can then devise a rubric to evaluate how well a student demonstrates the ability to complete the task. Because most authentic assessments require a judgement of the degree of quality, they tend toward the subjective end of the assessment scale. Rubrics are an "attempt to make subjective measurements as objective, clear, consistent, and as defensible as possible by explicitly defining the criteria on which performance or achievement should be judged."

== Examples ==
Examples of authentic assessment categories include:

- performance of the skills, or demonstrating use of a particular knowledge
- simulations and role plays
- renewable assignments, where a student adds value to a topic and makes this visible on Wikipedia and licenses the work openly
- studio portfolios, strategically selecting items

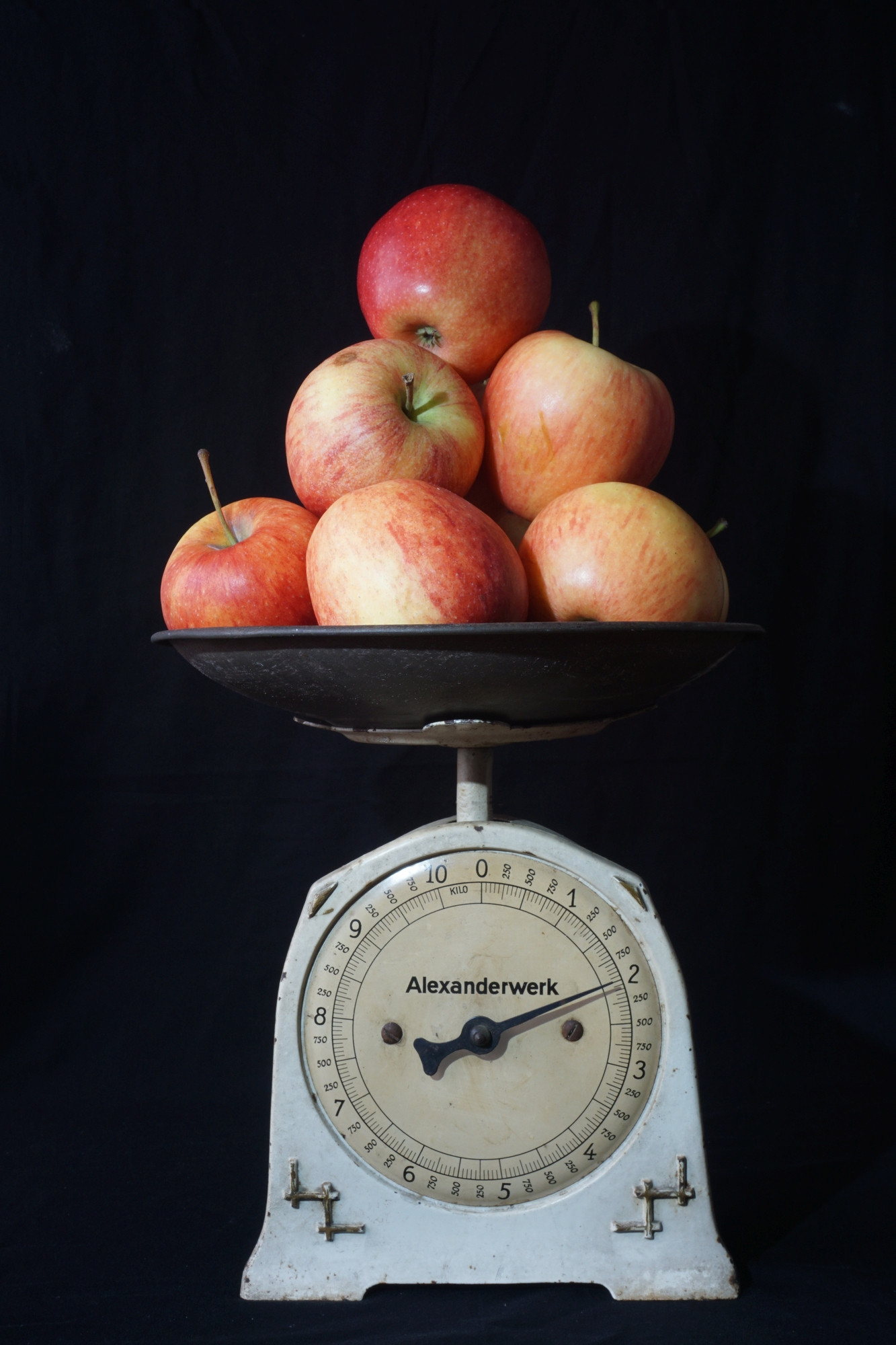
An authentic assessment might have students determine the weight or total cost of these apples.

Specific examples include:

- determining whether students can add up prices by having them add up the money spent by their own families on groceries that week
- determining whether nursing students can place IV lines by watching them place IV lines
- determining whether future drivers can safely drive a car by giving them a practical driving test

== Authentic vs. traditional ==
Traditionally, assessment follows curriculum. Authentic assessment is an example of "backwards design" because the curriculum follows from the assessment.

== Case studies ==
One case study was presented by Edutopia's Schools That Work series on New York based institution, School of the Future. This school stresses the process of authentically assessing students rather than focusing solely on test results or term papers. The school measures the full range of student ability through formative assessments, presentations, exhibitions, and tests that focus on authentic tasks to assess students' skills and knowledge as they relate to real-world endeavors and skills such as effective group communication and presentation. 98% of students at this school go on to college after graduating.

== Classroom implementation ==
Teachers from The School of The Future in New York utilize authentic assessment in their school and recommend that other teachers can do the same by following the guidelines outlined below:

- Write the assessment before the lesson plan
- Outline learning standards on rubrics to help to ensure rigor
- Use quick in-class assessments without warning or scaffolding to assess student understanding and inform teaching
- Ask students to reflect and assess themselves
- Use online or traditional tools to track a student’s work quality over time

== Goals ==
A goal of authentic assessment is to determine if student knowledge can be applied outside of the classroom. This means that a physics assessment should involve doing physics by performing experiments and solving problems the same way that a real-life physicist would. An authentic history assessment requires students to ask questions, do independent research, and formulate answers to their questions, just like a real-life historian does. Authentic assessment:

- engages students and is based in content or media in which the students actually have a genuine interest.
- asks students to synthesize information and use critical-thinking skills.
- is a learning experience in and of itself.
- measures not just what students remember but how they think.
- helps students understand where they are academically and helps teachers know how to best teach them.

== See also ==
- Concept inventory – Knowledge assessment tool
- Criterion-referenced test
- Educational assessment – Educational evaluation method
- Framework for authentic intellectual work (AIW)
- Standardized test – Test administered and scored in a predetermined, standard manner
