= Open College =

Open College may refer to:

- Open College (Toronto), a distance learning service that produced and broadcast on-air college credit courses on radio station CJRT-FM in Toronto from 1971 to 2003
- Open College (UK), a public distance learning college from 1987 to 1991
- Open College of the Arts, a distance learning independent arts college based in Barnsley in South Yorkshire, England
- NOCN, National Open College Network, a network of UK organisations developed to recognise informal learning achieved by adults
  - Open Awards, a UK qualification awarding agency formerly known as the "Open College Network North West Region"
- AWQAF Africa Muslim Open College, an institution of AWQAF Africa's educational department in London 2005
- Open admissions, a non-competitive college admissions process in the United States in which the only criterion for entrance is a high school diploma or a General Educational Development certificate
- Open-door academic policy, a non-competitive college admissions process accepting all students without asking for evidence of previous education, experience, or references

== See also ==
- Open university (disambiguation)
