= Paradata (learning resource analytics) =

As a general definition, paradata are usage data about learning resources that include not just quantitative metrics (e.g., how many times a piece of content was accessed), but also pedagogic context, as inferred through the actions of educators and learners. Paradata may be operationalized as a specific type of metadata, however the construct differs from traditional descriptive metadata that classify the properties of the learning resource itself, and instead involves the capture—and open resharing—of in situ information about online users’ actions related to the resource. Learning resource paradata is generated through user processes of searching for content, identifying interest for subsequent use, correlating resources to specific learning goals or standards, and integrating content into educational practices. Paradata may include individual or aggregate user interactions such as viewing, downloading, sharing to other users, favoriting, and embedding reusable content into derivative works, as well as contextualizing activities such as aligning content to educational standards, adding tags, and incorporating resources into curriculum. Context about users is also of interest as paradata, including grade level or subject taught, experience level, or geographic location—as is information about the curricular relevance, audience, methodologies, and instructional settings of use as a resource is adopted by practitioners. Paradata are generally anonymized and/or aggregated at the community level to protect the privacy of individual users as data are shared between learning communities. Paradata may be expressed in realtime data streaming as user actions occur, or as periodic reporting of user activities over a range of time.

Related concepts include Contextualized Attention Metadata, activity streams, tagging and other social metadata, and user annotations.

== History ==
In 2010, the term paradata was adopted by the National Science Digital Library (NSDL) to reference data about user interactions with digital learning objects within the NSDL’s STEM Exchange initiative. The construct has since been adopted by other organizations engaged in digital library and digital learning resource projects including the Learning Registry initiative spearheaded by the Office of Educational Technology at the U.S. Department of Education and the Advanced Distributed Learning Initiative at the Department of Defense.

== Technical Frameworks for Sharing Learning Resource Paradata ==
In February 2011, NSDL released an open source XML paradata framework versioned as NSDL comm_para1.0, the structure of which parallels similar schemas for metadata so that it can interoperate with Dublin Core based schemas including nsdl-dc.

In October, 2011 the Learning Registry development team released its Paradata Specification V1.0 [ that details the schemata of JSON objects for representing learning resource paradata. In 2016 the US Dept of Ed and others published a spec for various companies to push their paradata to the Learning Registry. That would mean various resource libraries could aggregate data on educational resources in one place. As an example, OpenEd, Google, Microsoft and others would push data on how many times an educational video was used by teachers, to help rank them by popularity.
