= Open educational practices =

Practices used to implement open education

Open educational practices (OEP) are part of the broader open education landscape, including the openness movement in general. It is a term with multiple layers and dimensions and is often used interchangeably with open pedagogy or open practices. OEP represent teaching and learning techniques that draw upon open and participatory technologies and high-quality open educational resources (OER) in order to facilitate collaborative and flexible learning. Because OEP emerged from the study of OER, there is a strong connection between the two concepts. OEP, for example, often, but not always, involve the application of OER to the teaching and learning process. Open educational practices aim to take the focus beyond building further access to OER and consider how in practice, such resources support education and promote quality and innovation in teaching and learning. The focus in OEP is on reproduction/understanding, connecting information, application, competence, and responsibility rather than the availability of good resources. OEP is a broad concept which can be characterised by a range of collaborative pedagogical practices that include the use, reuse, and creation of OER and that often employ social and participatory technologies for interaction, peer-learning, knowledge creation and sharing, empowerment of learners, and open sharing of teaching practices.

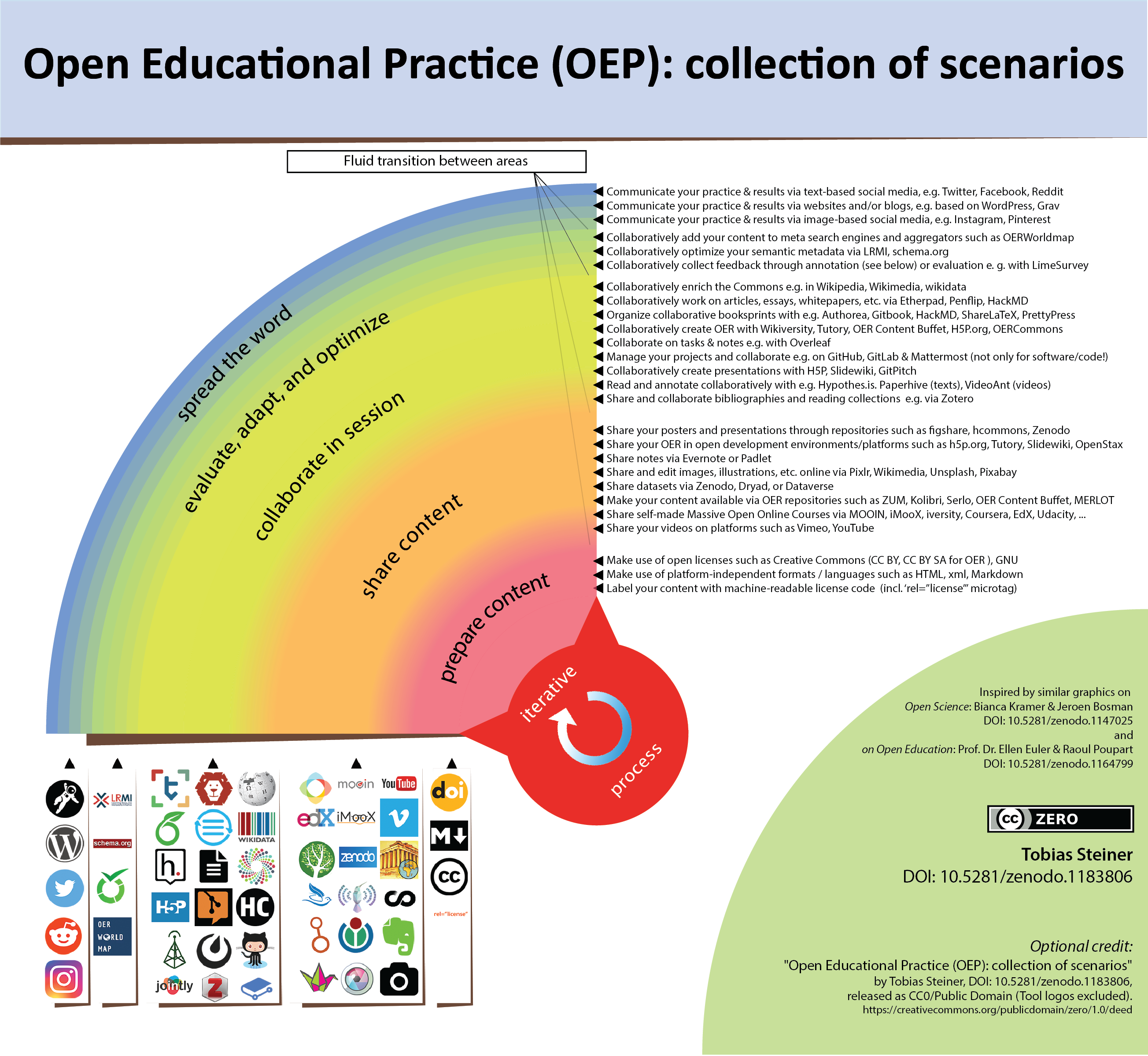
This diagram visualizes an exemplary selection of applications of the paradigm of open educational practices.

OEP may involve students participating in online, peer production communities within activities intended to support learning or more broadly, any context where access to educational opportunity through freely available online content and services is the norm. Such activities may include (but are not limited to), the creation, use and repurposing of open educational resources and their adaptation to the contextual setting. OEP can also include the open sharing of teaching practices and aim "to raise the quality of education and training and innovate educational practices on an institutional, professional and individual level." The OEP community includes educational professionals (i.e. teachers, educational developers, researchers), policy makers, managers/administrators of organisations, and learners. OER are often created as part of an OEP strategy, and viewed as a contribution to the transformation of 21st century learning and learners.

== Scope of open educational practices ==
Open educational practices fall under the broader movement of openness in education, which is an evolving concept shaped by the shifting needs and available resources of societies, cultures, geographies, and economies. Developing a precise definition, thus, is a challenge. OEP are sometimes used interchangeably with the term open educational pedagogies. While OEP are inclusive of open pedagogies represented by teaching techniques, OEP can also incorporate open scholarship, open course design, open educational advocacy, social justice, open data, ethics, and copyright." Creating a database or repository of open educational resources is not open educational practice (Ehlers 2011) but can be part of an open teaching strategy.

OEP can be grounded in the concept of open pedagogies as described by Hegarty which include:

1. Participatory Technologies
2. People, Openness, Trust
3. Innovation and Creativity
4. Sharing Ideas and Resources
5. Connected Community
6. Learner-Generated
7. Reflective Practice
8. Peer Review

Nascimbeni & Burgos (2016) offer a definition that identifies activities such as course design, content creation, pedagogy, and assessment design as areas for infusing OEP. Paskevicius provides an alternative definition:

Teaching and learning practices where openness is enacted within all aspects of instructional practice; including the design of learning outcomes, the selection of teaching resources, and the planning of activities and assessment. OEP engage both faculty and students with the use and creation of OER, draw attention to the potential afforded by open licences, facilitate open peer-review, and support participatory student-directed projects.

=== Definitions ===
While a canonical definition of open educational practice does not exist, various groups and scholars have provided their interpretation or viewpoint. A definition used by others either in its entirety or as basis for further development is provided by the Ehlers, who defines OEP "as practices which support the (re)use and production of OER through institutional policies, promote innovative pedagogical models, and respect and empower learners as co-producers on their lifelong learning path". Here is a list of some other OEP definitions.

- The Open Educational Quality (OPAL) Initiative define open educational practices as "the use of Open Educational Resources to raise the quality of education and training and innovate educational practices on institutional, professional and individual level".
- The International Council for Open and Distance Education (ICDE): "Open Educational Practices are defined as practices which support the production, use and reuse of high quality open educational resources (OER) through institutional policies, which promote innovative pedagogical models, and respect and empower learners as co-producers on their lifelong learning path".
- The UK OER support and evaluation team suggest that (compared to ICDE) "a broader definition would encompass all activities that open up access to educational opportunity, in a context where freely available online content and services (whether 'open', 'educational' or not) are taken as the norm".
- The Institute for the Study of Knowledge Management in Education (ISKME) defines Open Educational Practices (OEP) as comprising a set of skills in collaboration, curation, curricular design, and leadership around the use of Open Educational Resources. OEP build educator capacity for using OER to improve curriculum, instruction, and pedagogy, and to gain skills in digital resource curation and curriculum creation, and to actively collaborate around and advocate for innovative approaches to open education and OER. ISKME developed the Open Educational Practice Rubric to articulate key learning objectives for integrating OER and open educational practice into teaching and learning improvement and leadership.
- The Center for Open Learning and Teaching (University of Mississippi) state that "Open Educational Practices (OEP) are teaching techniques that introduce students to online peer production communities. Such communities (for instance, Wikipedia, YouTube, Open Street Map) host dynamic communities and offer rich learning environments".
- The European Foundation for Quality in e-Learning (EFQUEL) write that Open Educational Practices are "the next phase in OER development which will see a shift from a focus on resources to a focus on open educational practices being a combination of open resources use and open learning architectures to transform learning into 21st century learning environments in which universities’, adult learners and citizens are provided with opportunities to shape their lifelong learning pathways in an autonomous and self-guided way".
- The Cape Town Open Education Declaration (with over 2,500 signatories) reads: "open education is not limited to just open educational resources. It also draws upon open technologies that facilitate collaborative, flexible learning and the open sharing of teaching practices that empower educators to benefit from the best ideas of their colleagues. It may also grow to include new approaches to assessment, accreditation and collaborative learning".

=== OEP areas ===
Best practice case studies identify a number of OEP areas.

- Business Model for OEP
- Commitment
- Creation of OER
- Digital Literacy
- Incentives and/or Motivation
- IPR Framework for OEP
- Mindsets and Attitudes
- Open Educational Practices
- Partnerships
- Quality Concepts
- Relevance: How to Convince Others of OEP?
- Repurposing OER
- Sharing OER
- Skills and Knowledge for OEP
- Strategy and/or Policy for OEP
- Support Mechanisms
- Tools for Sharing
- Using OER
- Vision of OEP

These areas surround the following topics, with other studies identifying categories and elements of open educational practices.

Topics

- Using OER
- Innovation
- Learning
- Improving Quality
- Something Else

Categories

- open educational resources
- open/public pedagogies
- open learning
- open scholarship
- open sharing (of teaching practice)
- open technologies

Elements

- Infrastructure (tools)
- OER Use
- Open Design
- Adoption
- Policy

== Impact ==
Some scholars claim that the breadth of definitions through which OEP are described impairs researchers' ability to measure the impact of OEP. Others, however, have undertaken projects exploring and documenting OEP which demonstrate potential areas of impact. For instance, adopting OEP can lead to opportunities for collaborative learning through the affordances of Web 2.0 tools. OEP can support innovative pedagogy as an extension of teaching and learning practices. In this context, open also refers to the learning environment where learner's set their own objectives rather than being restricted by those set externally (a closed environment). Additionally, OEP has shown potential for use in addressing social justice issues through provision of increased access, modification for inclusion of diverse voices, and democratization of scholarly conversations.

=== OEP and collaborative learning ===
The presence of a shared knowledge creation experience is one characteristic included in most definitions of OEP. The networked participation which takes place as learners work together in a community to create knowledge can result in increased student engagement. Artifacts created contribute to the community beyond the walls of the classroom, something described in Knowledge Building theory as adding value to student work even beyond its use as an evaluation of student understanding.

=== OEP and innovative pedagogy ===
Much of the impact of OEP is a result of the "transformational role" of the collaboration taking place between instructors and students. Open educational practices can also provide the experience and tools to help bridge the gap between formal and informal learning, and potentially an open source curriculum or emergent curriculum. Use of these tools and experience facilitate innovative pedagogical practices resulting in benefits beyond simply mastering course content. For instance, Nusbaum describes a project in which students were invited to modify the openly licensed textbook being used in their psychology course. These student modifications diversified the content and helped create a resource more reflective of the context in which the students were taking the class.

=== OEP and social justice ===
Research continues to document the impact of OEP in addressing social justice issues. Cronin and McLaren found the incorporation of OEP can lead to increased awareness, use, and creation of open educational resources, alleviating high textbook costs which create barriers to education for some students. Student voices incorporated through OEP can diversify the content of the course, teaching, learning, and research materials. Nusbaum (2020) found that diversifying content through OEP contributes to an improved sense of belonging for subsequent students using the resource. Embracing OEP offer advantages regarding social justice, but it is important to think about social justice critically. For doing this the work of Lambert (2018), Hodgkinson-Williams and Trotter and Bali et al. is enlightening. Lambert, for example, argues that technology driven initiatives can help only when there is awareness and willingness from societies, governments and individuals to make changes to address social injustices. Open education in online learning does not provide affordability to disadvantaged learners by default, this needs to be embedded with care and awareness. She introduces her own definition of OEP framed under a social justice perspective:

Open Education is the development of free digitally enabled learning materials and experiences primarily by and for the benefit and empowerment of non-privileged learners who may be under-represented in education systems or marginalised in their global context. Success of social justice aligned programs can be measured not by any particular technical feature or format, but instead by the extent to which they enact redistributive justice, recognitive justice and/or representational justice

This definition includes the idea of social injustice, which is taken from Fraser's work on abnormal justice. Fraser created a tripartite model of justice based on three pillars, redistribution, recognition and representation. These pillars are taken by Lambert and reinterpreted in the context of open education:

- Redistributive justice – This dimension is related with economically inequalities. It involves the allocation of free educational resources or human resources to earners who otherwise cannot afford them. If possible additional free support for learners should be available
- Recognitive justice – This dimension is concerned with cultural inequities and it involves respect and recognition for cultural and gender differences. There is a duty to recognise cultural, ethic, religious diversity when designing the curriculum, everybody should feel recognised in the curriculum. The implication of this principle would be to design educational material with learners and their needs in mind.
- Representational justice – This dimension is related with political exclusion in education. It is based on principle of self-determination, where disadvantaged and marginalised groups should present their own stories themselves, rather than told by others. This involves equitable representation and political voice. This implies to design with representatives of the community if possible.

== Level of openness ==
Levels of openness in educational practice can be seen on a continuum, on a continual decision making process, and not universally experienced. The trajectory toward OEP happens between the application of open pedagogical models, use of OER, and creation of OER creation in a range from low to high:

- Low - teachers believe they know what learners need to learn. A focus on knowledge transfer.
- Medium - Predetermined Objectives (closed environment) but, using open pedagogical models and encourage dialogue and problem-based learning.
- High - Learning Objectives and pathways are highly governed by learners.

Those engaged in OEP are negotiating between competing issues when making pedagogical decisions at the macro (global) level, meso (community/ network level), micro (individual level), and the nano (interaction) levels. At each of these levels, individuals ask themselves questions such as: Will I share openly? Whom will I share with? Who will I share as? Will I share this?

== Initiatives ==
=== The OPAL Consortium ===
OPAL members		Country
International Council for Open and Distance Education	ICDE	Norway
United Nations Educational, Scientific and Cultural Organization	UNESCO	France
Open University	OU	United Kingdom
European Foundation for Quality in e-Learning	EFQUEL	Belgium
Aalto University	AALTO	Finland
Universidade Católica Portugesa	UCP	Portugal
University Duisburg-Essen	UDE	Germany

The Open Educational Quality (OPAL) Initiative define open educational practices as "the use of Open Educational Resources (OER) to raise the quality of education and training and innovate educational practices on institutional, professional and individual level".

For the mainstreaming of open educational practices OPAL recommends:

- Enabling Legislation to Facilitate OEP
  - Incentivising OEP through Legislation
  - Reducing Legislative Burdens through Harmonisation
  - Rethinking Intellectual Property Law for the 21st Century
- Empowering Learners to take up OEP
  - Addressing Fragmentation in Learning Resources
  - Promoting the provision of Open Educational Assessment
- Strengthening the Evidence-Base of OEP
  - Helping institutions nurture OEP
  - Addressing Sustainability Concerns
  - Making the Societal Benefit Explicit
- Culturing Innovation through Networks
  - Supporting Truly Open Collaboration
  - Building a Coalition of Stakeholders around Principles of Openness
- Improving Trust in OEP
  - Integrate OEP into Institutional Quality Procedures
  - Create Open Academic/Scientific Trust Infrastructures

The International Council for Open and Distance Education sees OEP as those practices which support the production, use and reuse of high quality open educational resources and regards that OEP are often achieved through institutional policies, which promote innovative pedagogical models, and respect. Learners are empowered as co-producers on their lifelong learning path. The scope of OEP covers all areas of OER governance: policy makers, managers and administrators of organizations, educational professionals and learners.

=== The OLCOS Consortium ===
OLCOS members	Country
European Centre for Media Competence	Germany
European Distance and E-learning Network	Hungary
FernUniversität Hagen	Germany
Mediamaisteri Group	Finland
Open University of Catalonia	Spain
project co-ordinator Salzburg Research / EduMedia Group	Austria

Open e-Learning Content Observatory Services (OLCOS) project is a Transversal Action under the European eLearning Programme.

The OLCOS Roadmap focuses on Open Educational Practices, providing orientation and recommendations to educational decision makers on how to develop the use of OER. To further benefit from OERs one needs to better understand how their role could promote innovation and change in educational practices.

The Roadmap states that delivering OER to the dominant model of teacher-centred knowledge transfer will have little effect in equipping teachers, students and workers with the knowledge and skills required in the knowledge economy and, lifelong learning. Downloading Web-accessible, open teaching materials for classes and, continuing a one-way channel of content provision, will likely mirror the little impact achieved with regard to changing educational practices following the massive investments in the e-learning infrastructure by educational institutions. Open Educational Practices aim to deliver a competency-focused, constructivist paradigm of learning and promote a creative and collaborative engagement with digital content, tools and services to meet knowledge and skills required today.

=== SCORE ===
The Support Centre for Open Resources in Education (SCORE) at the Open University (UK) was the second major initiative to be funded by the Higher Education Funding Council for England (Hefce). (The first was the UKOER programme, jointly run by the Joint Information Systems Committee (JISC) and the Higher Education Academy (HEA)).

Discussions and actions were moving on from how open educational resources are published to how they are used. Placing OER as an enabler, within a wider set of open educational practices. Over a period of three years, SCORE, initiated a series of activities and events that involved several hundred educational practitioners from the majority of the higher education institutions in England.

There has been interest in how educational practitioners would accept and embed open resources into their practices. Sharing is at the heart of the philosophy OER and probably OEP and thus collective and cooperative activities between people and institutions are likely to be a key factor in the sustainability of such practices. SCORE reports it succeeded in raising the profile of OER and OEP within UK higher education institutions by assisting existing communities of practice and by creating new communities of practice to form a much larger network of practice that will be sustained by its participants.

== Challenges ==
There are many challenges to the adoption of open educational practices. Certain aspects like technology have received greater attention than others but all of the factors below inhibit widespread use of open educational practices:

- Technology - Lack of or insufficient investment in broadband access as well as up-to-date software and hardware
- Business Model - OER and OEP can incur a significant provider cost. Typically financial models focus on technology, but they also need to account for staff; i.e., those who create, reuse, mix, and modify the content.
- Law & Policy - There is either ignorance on open access licenses, such as Creative Commons license and GNU General Public License, and/or restrictive intellectual property rights that limit the development of OEP.
- Pedagogy - Traditional models of learning are teacher-centric where teachers dispense knowledge to students, and teachers/professors may not know how to integrate OEP into courses.
- Quality Assessment - There is not a quick and universal way to assess the quality of OER. MERLOT, based on the academic peer review process, has only reviewed 14% of submitted material.
- Cultural Imperialism - There is the concern that Western institutions use OEP to design educational courses for developing countries.
- Addressing matters of social justice - This dimension of OEP entails deliberate work, it needs to be a dimension that is built in the practice and OERs informed by theories of social justice. Therefore a dedicated section on social justice in OEP is needed.

=== Strategies and recommendations ===
In order for there to be widespread adoption of OEP, legal and educational policy must change and OEP needs to become sustainable.

- Funding - Develop a sustainable funding model for OEP that addresses technology and staffing. Various funding models being explored and examples:

- Endowment model, e.g. the Stanford Encyclopedia of Philosophy Project.
- Membership model, e.g. Sakai Educational Partners Program where member organizations pay a fee.
- Donations model, e.g. Wikipedia and Apache Foundation. Even though Apache has modified it so that there are fees for some services.
- Conversion model, e.g. Redhat, Ubuntu, SuSe. They convert free subscribers to paying customers for advanced features and support.
- Contributor pay model, e.g. Public Library of Science (PLoS) where contributors pay for the cost of maintaining the contribution.
- Sponsorship model, e.g. MIT iCampus Outreach Initiative, which is sponsored by Microsoft & China Open Resources for Education, and Stanford on iTunes, which is sponsored by Stanford & Apple. They are free for users with commercial messages by sponsors.
- Institutional model, e.g. MIT OpenCourseWare Project.
- Government model including UN programmes, e.g. Canada's SchoolNet Project.
- Partnership and exchange, e.g. Universities working together to create OER systems.

- Law & policy - In terms of law, there should be an open access mandate for partially or fully publicly funded research. Also teachers and researchers should be better informed about their intellectual property rights. Researchers and teachers who use public funding should sign non-exclusive copyrights so their institutions make their work available under appropriate licenses.
- Open advocates should demand public-private partnerships.
- Build stakeholders
- Quality assessment
- Pedagogy - Help teachers change to facilitate use of OEP to emphasize learners' developing competences, knowledge, and skills. Therefore, teaching is no longer educator-centric, but instead it focuses on what learners can do for themselves.

== See also ==
- Andragogy
- Digital literacy
- Edutopia
- Emergent curriculum
- Global SchoolNet
- OER Commons
- Open content
- Open educational resources policy
- Open.Michigan
- Open-source curriculum
- OpenLearn
- Connexions
- Wikiversity
