= List of open universities =

This list includes schools worldwide that identify as open universities, either as part of their titles or as an explicit tenet of their educational philosophy and methods. Open education is a core value for these institutions; they are not just secondary offshoots from more traditional universities. This list does not include distance learning units of traditional universities, some of which branded as open university systems.

The information shown for each school is deliberately limited. Each university listed here is linked to an existing article, where more information and verifiable references can be found.

(Column headings: 'DL' = distance learning, 'PC' = physical campus)

== Africa ==
Name	Type	Headquarters location	Country or territory	DL	PC
National Open University of Nigeria	Public	Abuja	Nigeria	Yes	Yes
Miva Open University	Private	Abuja	Nigeria	Yes	
Open University of Mauritius	Public	Réduit, Moka District	Mauritius		Yes
Open University of Kenya	Public	Konza	Kenya	Yes	Yes
Open University of Tanzania	Public	Dar es Salaam	Tanzania	Yes	
Open University of Sudan	Public	Khartoum	Sudan	Yes	
Zambian Open University	Private	Lusaka	Zambia		Yes
Zimbabwe Open University	Public	Harare	Zimbabwe	Yes	
International Open University	Private	Kanifing	Gambia	Yes	
Université Général Lansana Conté	Public	Sonfonia	Guinea	Yes	
Botswana Open University	Public	Gaborone	Botswana		Yes

== Asia ==
Asia
Name	Type	Headquarters location	Country or territory	DL	PC
Ankara University	Public	Ankara	Turkey	Yes	Yes
Atatürk University	Public	Erzurum	Turkey	Yes	Yes
Bangladesh Open University	Public	Dhaka	Bangladesh	Yes	Yes
Teerthanker Mahaveer University	Private	Moradabad	India	Yes	Yes
Anadolu University	Public	Eskişehir	Turkey	Yes	Yes
Andhra Pradesh Open University	Public	Hyderabad, Telangana	India	Yes	Yes
Arab Open University	Private	Riyadh	Saudi Arabia	No	Yes
Al-Quds Open University	Public	Palestine	Palestine		
Dr. B.R. Ambedkar Open University	Public	Hyderabad, Telangana	India	Yes	Yes
Ho Chi Minh City Open University	Public	District 3, Ho Chi Minh City	Vietnam	yes	Yes
Hanoi Open University	Public	Hai Ba Trung District, Hanoi City	Vietnam	yes	Yes
Indira Gandhi National Open University	Public	Maidan Garhi, New Delhi	India	Yes	Yes
Jharkhand State Open University	Public	Ranchi, Jharkhand	India	Yes	Yes
Karnataka State Open University	Public	Mysore, Karnataka	India	Yes	Yes
Korea National Open University	Public	Seoul	South Korea	Yes	
Krishna Kanta Handiqui State Open University	Public	Guwahati, Assam	India	Yes	Yes
Madhya Pradesh Bhoj (Open) University	Public	Bhopal, Madhya Pradesh	India	Yes	Yes
Nalanda Open University	Public	Patna, Bihar	India	Yes	Yes
National Open University	Public	Luzhou District, New Taipei	ROC	Yes	
Nepal Open University	Public	Lalitpur, Bagmati	Nepal	Yes	Yes
Netaji Subhas Open University	Public	Kolkata, West Bengal	India	Yes	Yes
Odisha State Open University	Public	Sambalpur, Odisha	India	Yes	
Open Cyber University			South Korea		
Open University Malaysia	Private	Petaling Jaya	Malaysia	Yes	Yes
Open University of China	Public	Beijing	PRC	Yes	
Open University of Hong Kong	Public	Hong Kong		Yes	Yes
Open University of Israel	Public	Ra'anana, Central District	Israel	Yes	Yes
Open University of Kaohsiung	Public	Siaogang, Kaohsiung	ROC		Yes
Open University of Sri Lanka	Public	Nawala, Nugegoda	Sri Lanka	Yes	Yes
Pandit Sundarlal Sharma (Open) University	Public	Bilaspur district, Chhattisgarh	India	Yes	Yes
Payame Noor University	Public	Tehran	Iran	Yes	Yes
Shanghai Open University	Public	Shanghai	China	Yes	
Sukhothai Thammathirat Open University	Public	Nonthaburi	Thailand		
Tamil Nadu Open University	Public	Chennai, Tamil Nadu	India		Yes
The Open University of Japan	Private	Wakaba, Mihama-ku, Chiba City, Chiba	Japan	Yes	
Universitas Terbuka	Public	Tangerang Selatan, Banten	Indonesia	Yes	Yes
University of the City of Manila, Open University	Public	Intramuros, Manila	Philippines	Yes	Yes
University of the Philippines Open University	Public	Los Baños, Laguna	Philippines	Yes	Yes
Uttar Pradesh Rajarshi Tandon Open University	Public	Allahabad, Uttar Pradesh	India		
Uttarakhand Open University	Public	Haldwani, Uttarakhand	India	Yes	
Vardhaman Mahaveer Open University	Public	Kota, Rajasthan	India	Yes	
Venkateshwara Open University	Private	Naharlagun, Arunachal Pradesh	India		
Wawasan Open University	Private	George Town, Penang	Malaysia	Yes	Yes
Yashwantrao Chavan Maharashtra Open University	Public	Nasik, Maharashtra	India	Yes	Yes
Allama Iqbal Open University	Public	Islamabad	Pakistan	Yes	Yes
Virtual University of Pakistan	Public	Islamabad	Pakistan	Yes	Yes

== Oceania ==
Australia
Name	Type	Headquarters location	Country or territory	DL	PC
Open Universities Australia	Private	Melbourne, Victoria	Australia	Yes	

== Europe ==
Europe
Name	Type	Headquarters location	Country or territory	DL	PC
Hamburg Open Online University	Public	Hamburg	Germany	Yes	No
Hellenic Open University	Public	Patras	Greece	Yes	Yes
Taras Shevchenko National University – KNU Open University	Public; Self-Governing	Kyiv	Ukraine	Yes	Yes
Intercultural Open University Foundation	Private	Granada	Spain	Yes	
Istanbul University	Public	Istanbul	Turkey	Yes	Yes
Novi Sad Open University		Novi Sad	Serbia		
Open International University of Human Development "Ukraine"	Private	Kyiv	Ukraine	Yes	Yes
Open University of the Netherlands	Public	Heerlen	Netherlands	Yes	
Open University of Catalonia	Public	Barcelona	Spain	Yes	
Open University of Cyprus	Public	Nicosia	Cyprus	Yes	
The Open University	Public	Milton Keynes	United Kingdom	Yes	Yes
Universidade Aberta	Public	Lisbon	Portugal	Yes	
National University of Distance Education	Public	Madrid	Spain	Yes	Yes

== Americas ==
North America
Name	Type	Headquarters location	Country or territory	DL	PC
Athabasca University	Public	Athabasca, Alberta	Canada	Yes	Yes
Intercultural Open University Foundation	Private	Arden, Delaware	United States	Yes	
Open SUNY	Public	New York City, New York	United States	Yes	
University of the West Indies Global Campus	Public	Cave Hill	Barbados	Yes	Yes
Université TÉLUQ	Public	Quebec City, Quebec	Canada	Yes	Yes
Universidad Abierta y a Distancia de México	Public	Mexico City	Mexico	Yes	Yes

== South America ==
South America
Name	Type	Headquarters location	Country or territory	DL	PC
Interamerican Open University	Private	Buenos Aires	Argentina		
Universidad Nacional Abierta y a Distancia	Private	Colombia	Colombia		
Universidad Nacional Abierta	Public	Venezuela	Venezuela	Yes	Yes
