= Lifewide education =

Lifewide education is an educational concept that recognizes that learning occurs in multiple contexts within a learner's life: school, home, work, etc. It is the means by which an educational institution encourages, supports and recognizes students' lifewide learning.

It is a concept that is compared and contrasted to lifelong education, recognizing that not only does learning occur continually throughout one's life, it occurs broadly across every situation in one's life. The modern concept of lifewide learning first emerged in a report prepared by the Swedish National Agency for Education which stated:

The lifelong dimension represents what the individual learns throughout the whole life-span. Knowledge rapidly becomes obsolete and it is necessary for the individual to update knowledge and competence in a continuous process of learning. Education cannot be limited to the time spent in school, the individual must have a real opportunity to learn throughout life. The lifelong dimension is non-problematic, what is essential is that the individual learns throughout life. The lifewide dimension refers to the fact that learning takes place in a variety of different environments and situations, and is not only confined to the formal educational system. Lifewide learning covers formal, non-formal and informal learning.

The idea quickly spread through the policy community and became incorporated into the thinking of economists concerned with measuring value in lifelong learning. A presentation entitled "Measuring the Impact of the New Economy in Education Sector Outputs" dated 2002 on the UK Government Statistics Office website, makes reference to measuring lifewide learning. Richard Desjardins utilised the idea of lifewide learning in his conceptual framework for the economic evaluation of lifelong learning.

Learning does not occur just in school – it is both lifewide (i.e. it occurs in multiple contexts, such as work, at home and in our social lives) and lifelong (from cradle to grave). These different types of learning affect each other in a wide variety of ways. Their impact in terms of the outcomes of learning is equally complex – whether it is in the economic and social spheres, the individual and collective, the monetary and the non-monetary. Further complicating the picture are substantial gaps in our knowledge base on a number of issues, including the following:
- The cumulative and interactive impacts of lifewide and lifelong learning.
- The potential impacts of informal learning, later interventions in adulthood or even different types of formal education
- And the impacts of different curricula (general, academic, vocational) and impacts of different learning at different stages.

More recently an EU Foresight Report, "The Future of Learning: Preparing for Change", incorporated the lifewide concept into its central learning paradigm.

Examples of lifewide learning implementations can be found in the Hong Kong primary and secondary school systems, and the Surrey Centre for Excellence in Professional Training and Education (SCEPTrE) at the University of Surrey where the concept of lifewide learning and its recognition through a lifewide learning award was developed (Jackson 2011).
