= Open education =

Open culture movement

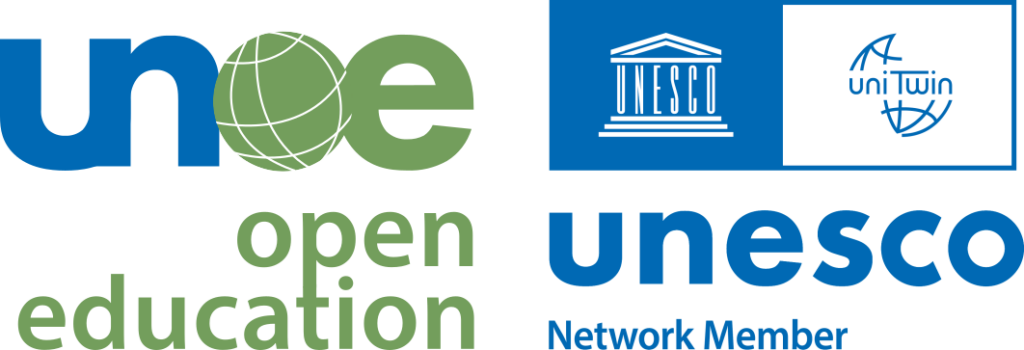
UNESCO's UNITWIN United Nations Open Education (UNOE) logo

Open education is an international learning standards and education policy open standards movement based on open source openness.

It was created inspired by the historiography of history of education educational movements of the twentieth century such as popular education, community education, and critical pedagogy, all of which promote the widening participation and inclusiveness in society based on open access with the aim of information access to learning and training in informal and formal education systems, mainly through online and distance education.

Its main products are open educational resources (OER), open source software educational technologies (edtech), open science, open research projects, and open educational practices.

== History ==
In the 1700s John Amos Comenius proposed open access to education as one of its core goals.

In the 1960s instructional designers and educators faced what was called then a "world-wide crisis in education" as education systems responded slowly to the demand for higher education, which required new models to meet the needs of a much larger and diversified group of lifelong learners.

In the 1970s these conditions led to the establishment of open and distance education systems globally, which developed many educative innovations like educational technologies (edtech) and the development of open universities.

In 1998 the Public Knowledge Project (PKP) was founded.

In 1999 the Connexions, the first massive open online courses (MOOCs), was established at Rice University in 1999, which transformed into OpenStax, and inspired more than 200 universities and organisations.

In 2001 the MIT Open CourseWare was founded.

In 2002 the Open Source Education Foundation (OSEF) was founded to create edtech for childhood education.

In 2003 the Berlin Declaration on Open Access to Knowledge in the Sciences and Humanities from the Open Access Movement was signed.

In 2007 the Cape Town Open Education Declaration was signed.

In 2008 the Open Education Global (OEGlobal) was launched by the OpenCourseware Consortium.

In 2008 the Virginia Open Education Foundation aiming at K–12 education.

In the 2010s educational services platform as a service (PaaS) such EdX, Coursera, and Udacity.

In 2012 the Open Education Week was inaugurated, as an annual event that occurs in the first of March, where people from all over the world can share best practices in a conference fair.

In 2019 open education has become the open standard of the United Nations Education Science Culture Organization (UNESCO) for world education.

In 2023 UNESCO University Twinning and Networking Programme (UNITWIN) United Nations Open Education (UNOE) was founded.

In 2025 an article in Scientific Reports discussed a multilayered framework predicting academic performance in open and distance learning.

== Characteristics ==
- Free education, public education, community education, and popular education
- Global civics
- Openness
- Freedom of access to information
- Open access
- Open publishing
- Open source software
- Open hardware
- Open research
- Open science
- Open university
- Instructional design
- Student information system privacy data security
- Open data
- Open knowledge library and information science (LIS)
- School participatory management and participatory budgeting open governance
- Critical theory
- Lifelong learning and lifewide learning
- Rhizomatic learning
- Personalized learning like homeschooling, flexible learning, and informal learning
- Open educational practices
- Networked learning and connected learning social technologies like renewable assignments
- Computer-mediated communication
- Open scholarships
- Collaboration co-creation community of inquiry (CoI)

== Technologies ==
- Educational technology
- Massive open online courses (MOOC) like Udemy and Open EdX
- CourseWare like OER Commons and MIT OpenCourseWare
- Educational games like Kahoot!
- Learning management system (LMS) like Google Classroom and Moodle
- Open educational resources (OER) like open textbooks
- Open Journal Systems (OJS)
- OpenSchool for school management

== Controversies ==
=== Privacy ===
While open educational resources are intended to expand access and reduce barriers to learning, they are often delivered through third-party technologies that may gather user data or share information with external entities. In some cases, students must accept broad terms of service in order to participate in online courses, which may include provisions for commercial data use or surveillance. These practices can conflict with the foundational goals of open education, including learner autonomy, transparency, and equitable access.

Open education platforms, including learning management systems and online tools, often fail to provide transparency about their data collection and usage practices, which can exacerbate privacy concerns for students. The lack of user consent regarding how their personal information is handled creates a vulnerability for the user. The long-term storage of sensitive personal data, such as biometric information for authentication and proctoring, can increase risks if proper security policies and measures are not implemented.

Many smart education environments are at risk due to poor security, and they become susceptible to cyberattacks such as malware and phishing. A study by the University of Chicago and New York University found that these tools can track a wide range of student activities, usually collecting more data than is necessary for educational purposes. This raises concerns about the potential for surveillance and the misuse of personal information, which includes students' academic records, study habits, and learning behaviors. Experts recommend that open education platforms prioritize transparency, robust security measures, and clear data policies to help mitigate these privacy and data security risks.

== Theory ==
Open education and flexible learning

Open education studies theory is motivated by a belief that learners want to exercise agency in their studies, particularly from a lifelong learning perspective. Throughout its history, open education has been associated with multiple meanings: access, flexibility, equity, collaboration, agency, democratisation, social justice, transparency, and removing barriers.

Researchers and practitioners in the field of open education have adopted generic educational theories such as social constructivism, behaviourism, and cognitivism, and then generated their own theoretical foundations following the emergence of open universities and the emergence of powerful and sophisticated digital technologies, such as networked learning or connectivism.

Open education has also been influenced by the philosophy of education of openness, characterized by an emphasis on transparency and collaboration. Initial conceptualizations of open education were characterized by independent study, where learners are independent of time and space through asynchronous learning, but also independent in developing their own learning strategies and practices, focused on personalized learning and learner autonomy and agency.

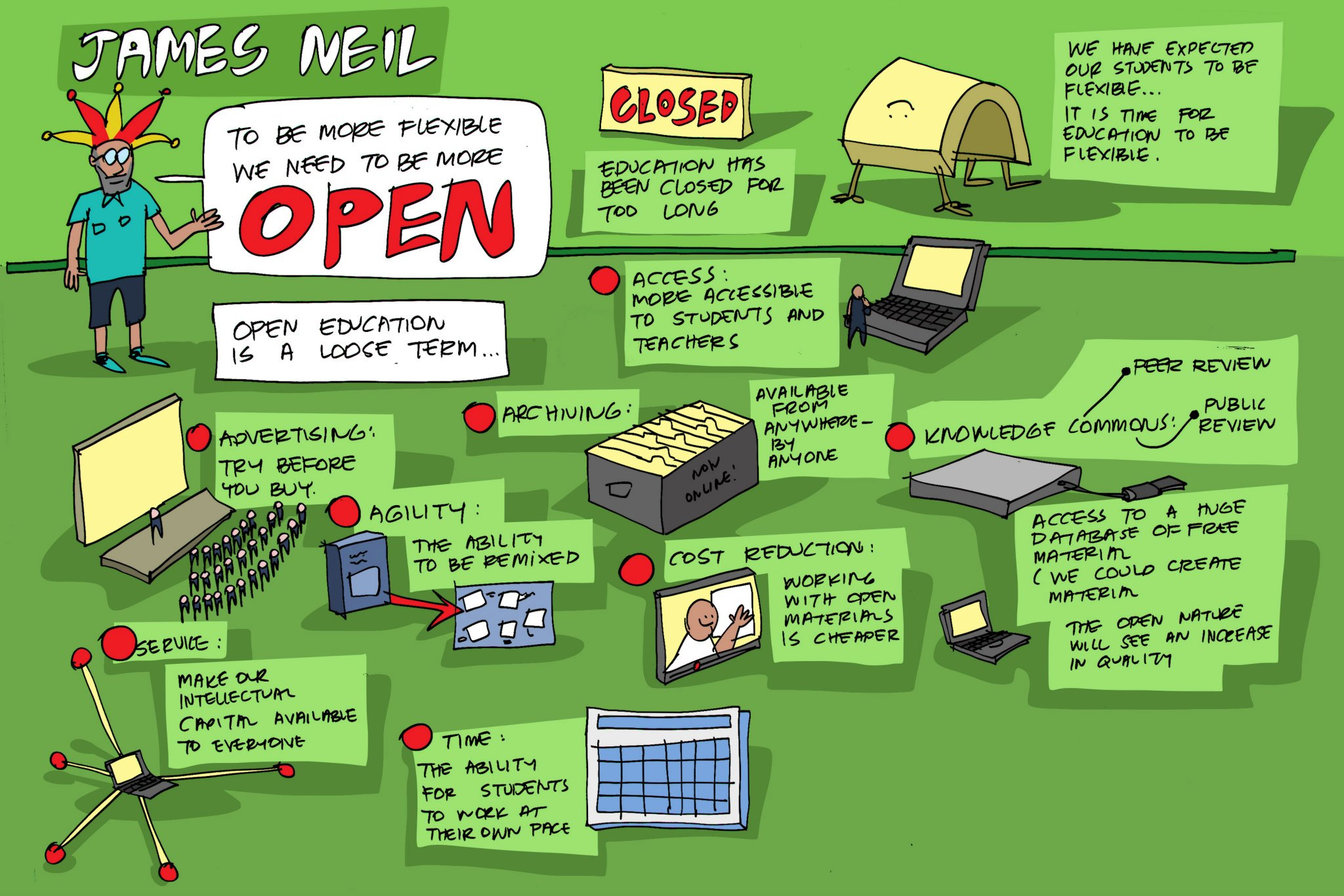
A diagram on open education and flexible learning distinctions

The community of inquiry (CoI) model proposed by Garrison, Anderson, and Archer (2000) was developed to provide conceptual order and act as a heuristic tool for the use of computer-mediated communication in support of educational experiences, particularly relevant for online and open education. The CoI model argues that a meaningful online learning experience is created through a combination of and interaction between cognitive, social, and teaching presence.

A range of other theories and conceptual frameworks relate to open education, including connectivism which adopts a non-linear approach to learning, influenced by complexity theory, where communities of knowledge are formed through connections forged in a networked learning environment. Connectivism relates to openness through its emphasis on learner autonomy and agency and its use of OER.

The study of autodidact self-determined learning, known as heutagogy also relates to open education, founded on the principles of self-efficacy and capability, meta-cognition and reflection, and non-linear learning. Self determined learning is often viewed as part of a continuum experience between pedagogy, andragogy and heutagogy, reflecting a shift from teacher-centred to learner-determined environments and activities.

A learning ecologies framework supports open education through both a lifelong and lifewide learning perspective, which is learning in different places simultaneously across the multiple contexts one inhabits. A learning ecologies approach rests on the possibilities of new technologies in facilitating self-sustaining, interest-driven and boundary crossing learning, interrelated with the openness in education movement.

A rhizomatic learning approach can also underlie forms of open education, characterised as an organic process where the curriculum is connected to the community and the learner navigates diversely connected learning environments by making links, negotiating the learning process, and adapting to change. In the most recent theoretical foundations of open education, including connectivism, heutagogy, and rhizomatic learning, openness arises from the learner-centred and non-linear design of learning contexts and resources and the promotion of learner agency and autonomy.

Governments, institutions, and people realize the importance of education. Human knowledge is crucial to producing competent leaders, innovators, and teachers. Educational systems must provide each individual the chance in building a better life.

More recently, theories which support open education have developed in line with the rapid evolution of networked digital technologies and the sophistication of social software. Technology has made the expansion of educational opportunities easier. Through the Internet, students can easily find information practically on any topic while mentors are capable of sharing their expertise with any student within seconds. Educational materials are disseminated to a global audience without additional costs. Evolving technology makes it possible for learners to interact with the global community in the comfort of their homes. Under distance learning, universities and colleges expand their impact through online courses that people in any country can take.

Open education includes resources such as practices and tools that are not hampered by financial, technical, and legal impediments. These resources are used and shared easily within the digital settings. Technology revolutionized techniques in sending receiving information on a daily basis particularly in education. Availability of web resources has transformed everything.

Open education is founded on open Eeducational resources (OER) comprised or learning, teaching, and research sources. With Open Education, the costs of textbooks which surged over three times the rate of inflation for many years must not hinder education. Based on the NBC News review of the Department of Labor Bureau of Labor Statistics data, prices of student books increased three times inflation rates from January 1977 until June 2015 reflecting an increase of 1,041 percent.

During the COVID-19 pandemic, with the global lockdowns, remote learning gained popularity. Tools like Google Classroom, Nearpod, and Kahoot! helped facilitate the shift to online learning for millions of students. OER can possibly address this problem since materials are free online and economical in printed form. Resources intended for buying textbooks can be rechanneled towards technology, enhancing the medium of instructions, and lowering debt. Research studies also showed many students learn more because of their access to quality materials. Technology also has unlimited potentials in raising teaching and learning to a higher level.

An example of an institutional practice in line with open education would be decreasing barriers to entry, for example, eliminating academic admission requirements. Universities which follow such practices include the Open University in Britain, Athabasca University and Thompson Rivers University, Open Learning in Canada and the Open University of Catalonia, in Spain, among many others (see full list here). Massive open online courses (MOOC) and OpenCourseWare are among the most recent and visible approaches to open education, adopted by universities worldwide. Although many MOOC's have free enrolment, the costs of acquiring a certification may be a barrier. Many open education institutes offer free certification schemes accredited by organizations like UKAS in the UK and ANAB in the United States; others offer a badge.

== See also ==
- List of free educational software
