= Renewable assignment =

Learning activity

A renewable assignment is a learning activity that are completed by students of a course that has worth outside of the specific setting of that course. The value of a renewable assignment is that the assignment, once completed by the students, can then be published for viewing and expansion by other students or by the wider scholarly community. These types of assignments are an important component of the open pedagogy model of learning.

== Definition and scope ==
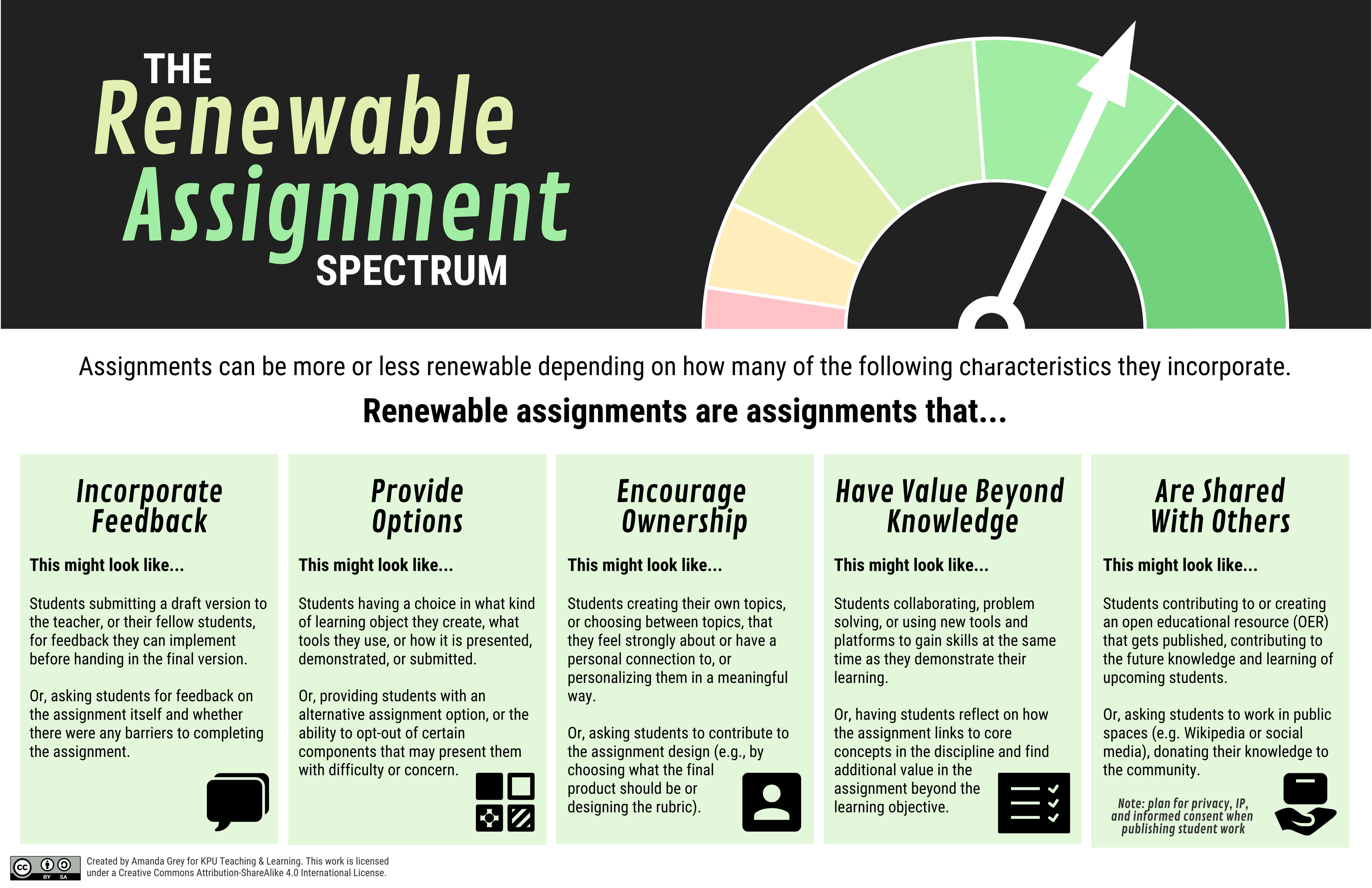
Infographic indicating what qualities a renewable assignment should have.

There are four criteria for an assignment to be considered renewable:

1. student creates an artifact
2. the artifact has value beyond supporting its creator’s learning
3. the artifact is made public, and
4. the artifact is openly licensed.

When only the first criterion is met, an assignment is considered disposable. These can include essays, exams, and homework. A disposable assignment assigns students to create and submit an artifact that is ultimately discarded. Disposable assignments are typically only seen by the teacher or instructor of the course and rarely has meaning outside of the individual student's learning and credit for completing the assignment. More specifically, a disposable assignment has no lasting impact outside of the course where the assignment was given.

In contrast, an artifact created for a renewable assignment is openly accessible to the public. This open license allows other students or academics on a broader scale to continuously contribute to and improve the artifact. These assignments are typically a form of an authentic task, which enable students to apply their knowledge and learning in a more realistic setting, hence creating value beyond supporting the student-creator's learning. They can be completed online or as an internal resource used by that education department. If agreed to by the students and educators completing the assignment, it then could be potentially licensed under a Creative Commons license and possibly have a lasting benefit to the broader community as an open educational resource.

== Student benefits ==
The benefits of renewable assignments include fostering student autonomy and self-determination. Renewable assignments have been shown to have multiple learning benefits for the students completing them. According to a study published in College Teaching, "renewable assignments had higher levels of reported interest/enjoyment, perceived choice, perceived competence, relatedness, and pride than did traditional assignments. Traditional assignments had higher levels of reported pressure." Another goal is to cultivate a students ability to communicate openly with other students, professionals, and educators and enable them to participate in scholarly discourse. This helps students develop critical thinking and skills that may be used to obtain employment in their area of expertise after the course has completed.

== Popularity ==
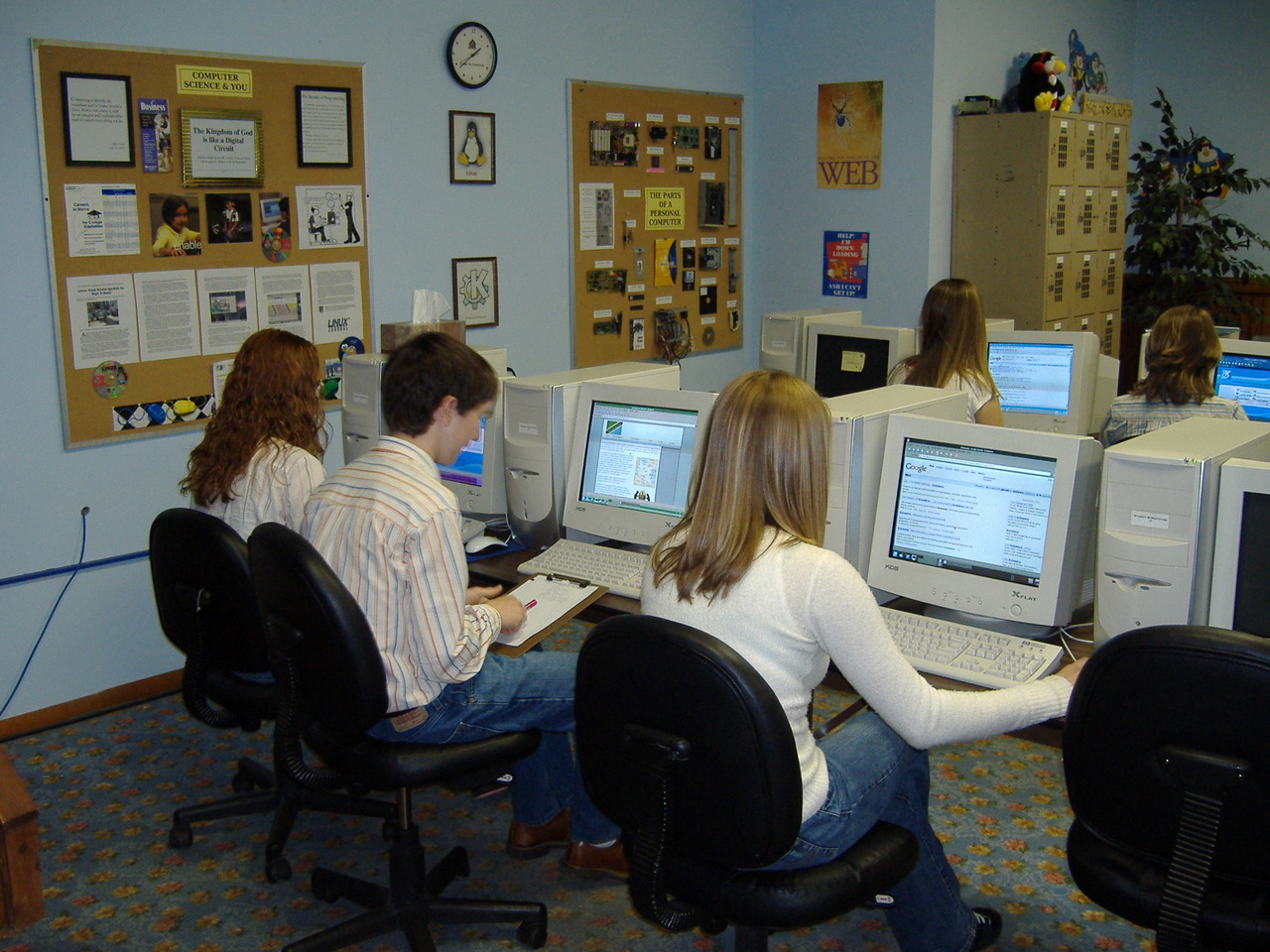
Computers have allowed for easier collaboration and exposure to students work.

Renewable assignments have been growing in popularity at graduate universities and gained more popularity since university teaching has shifted from a lecturer disseminating their knowledge in front of the class, to a more student-centered, constructivist approach. When given a reusable assignment, students then become an active learners, capable of constructing and developing their own knowledge. Instead of listening passively, the take on a more active role in their thought development and education.

Renewable assignments are popular among digitally capable students. They give student effort more value since their submissions are visible beyond the grade book of a course. The knowledge that their work is exposed to a wider audience can motivate them to exert more effort and produce better work than they otherwise might have. Renewable assignments align with the idea that students want recognition for their efforts.

== Examples ==
These types assignments can take many different forms. Examples include:

- A group of students co-creating or update an existing glossary in an open source textbook.
- A cohort of instructional designers producing an online textbook about project management.
- Students developing a public interest website or wiki of their chosen subject
- A group of computer programming students or webpage designers creating HTML5 content for the H5P Content Hub where interactive content can be shared and reused.
- Students reviewing relevant textbooks for their chosen subject.
- Medical students creating or editing existing articles on Wikipedia to share and update public health information contained in those articles.
