= OER Commons =

Freely accessible online library

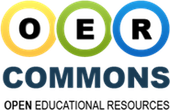
- Owner: ISKME
- Website: oercommons.org
- Launched: 2007

OER Commons (OER for open educational resources) is a freely accessible online library that allows teachers and others to search and discover open educational resources (OER) and other freely available instructional materials.

== History ==
OER Commons was created in 2007 by the Institute for the Study of Knowledge Management in Education to help curriculum experts and educators discover open educational resources (OER). It grew into a platform supporting collaboration around the use, evaluation, and improvement of those materials. Resources on the site can be searched and filtered using an expanded set of descriptive data, including conditions of use. Teachers, students, and others enrich this "metadata" when they tag, rate, and review materials, and share what works for them.

The initial project was supported by a grant from the William and Flora Hewlett Foundation. At the time it was one of the few digital libraries for openly licensed and freely available content. By aggregating resources and standardizing metadata from OER content providers, the site supported knowledge sharing and access to teaching and learning materials, strategies, and curricula online. Individual educators submit their own contributions, which are curated and reviewed by others for quality and alignment to standards. All materials must be available under a Creative Commons license.

A second phase of development started in 2009, with support from the Ford Foundation, including a teacher training program. As part of this program, ISKME trained educators from over 25 countries to use OER through workshops and summer academies, such as the Teachers as Makers Academies.

== Research ==
ISKME's early OER research, by Lisa Petrides and Cynthia Jimes, revealed how teachers’ exposure to OER, tools and professional development cultivates collaboration among teachers, as well as new conversations and reflection about teaching practices and roles.

Furthermore, research conducted on the impact of teachers’ participation in ISKME's own OER training network revealed that engagement with OER reduced teacher isolation, as well as expanded the role of teachers in becoming more active innovators as they shared, collaborated and learned from one another. This work also revealed the role that OER teacher champions play in sharing the benefits of OER with colleagues and supporting the knowledge sharing, collaboration, and use of OER in online OER communities.

ISKME's research also explored OER as a vehicle for disseminating adaptable curricula that support learner-centric approaches to pedagogy. ISKME's evaluation of the Community College Open Textbook Project revealed that study habits improved when learners were able to interact with open course material, and that students’ use of open textbooks cultivated new, self-directed learning behaviors.

Finally, this research revealed the role that collaboration plays in supporting the creation of open educational resources. Specifically, a study of authors who created content within the open repository Connexions revealed how as content creation group size increased beyond one author, the probability that users stayed with Connexions (and continued to create content) increased with it.

== Technology and design ==
ISKME's technology platform, tools, and metadata enhancement in its work with OER Commons are designed to support an open platform that serves as a knowledge base for content providers and platform developers, particularly related to accessibility and inclusive design. Metadata, data that describes a resource, and in the case of open educational resources, includes descriptors such as title, author, material type, and material license. Metadata standards provide a template for OER providers to share their resources with other providers. OER Commons receives feeds of OER in Dublin Core (DC), IEEE's Learning Object Metadata (LOM), and RSS. OER Commons provide targets to other providers to harvest content in these formats.

Partnered with the Inclusive Design Research Centre since 2010 to incorporate FLOE components into the OER Commons platform, ISKME's efforts combine OER discovery and enhancement tools and processes with FLOE's personalized network-delivered accessibility standards and tools.

In 2012, ISKME released Open Author, an authoring and remixing environment to support the creation and adaption of multi-media accessible OER and enable collaborative workflows of content reviewers and creators. The authoring environment produces OER that is accessible using a broad range of assistive technology devices such as screen readers.

To support user contributions, in 2010 ISKME released the OER-Connector browser plug-in that enables users to add resources to OER Commons.

To support interoperability, OER Commons is an experimental node in the Learning Registry, a joint US Department of Education and US Department of Defense initiative to support educational content and platform interoperability.

The OER Commons contains custom curated resource collections, or microsites. Within a microsite, OER is presented in the context of customized taxonomies to categorize and describe relevant OER. In 2011, ISKME announced the Green Micro-site with Greek partner Agro-Know. It is an aggregation of sustainability-related learning resources and features interdisciplinary lesson plans such as STEAM (Science Technology Engineering Art and Math) resources.

The OER Commons infrastructure facilitates evaluation of content and alignment to quality rubrics and standards. Starting in 2011, OER Commons provides an embedded Common Core State Standards alignment tool and Achieve OER Rubric to support state-level curriculum committees as well as individual instructors to review content for quality and alignment and to collaboratively address gaps in content collections.

== Awards ==
ISKME was named an Education Laureate by the San Jose Tech Museum of Innovation in 2007 for OER Commons.

In December 2010, ISKME was named a finalist in the Qatar Foundation World Innovation Summit for Education (WISE) Awards for its OER Commons teacher professional development programs.

In 2011, ISKME won the Award for Bodies which Influence Policy from the Open Educational Quality Initiative (OPAL), a consortium that includes UNESCO, the International Council for Open and Distance Education, the European Foundation for Quality in e-Learning, and several European universities.

== See also ==
- Open educational practices
- Open educational resources
- Open textbook
- Open education
