= Open supported learning =

Open supported learning is the teaching method employed and pioneered by The Open University (OU), and is not the same as distance education or correspondence courses.

The term open refers to the open-door academic policy of OU, and the term supported refers to the fact that the students receive constant academic attention by academic staff and tutors.

== See also ==
- Open Research Online
