= Open university (concept) =

School with minimal entry requirements

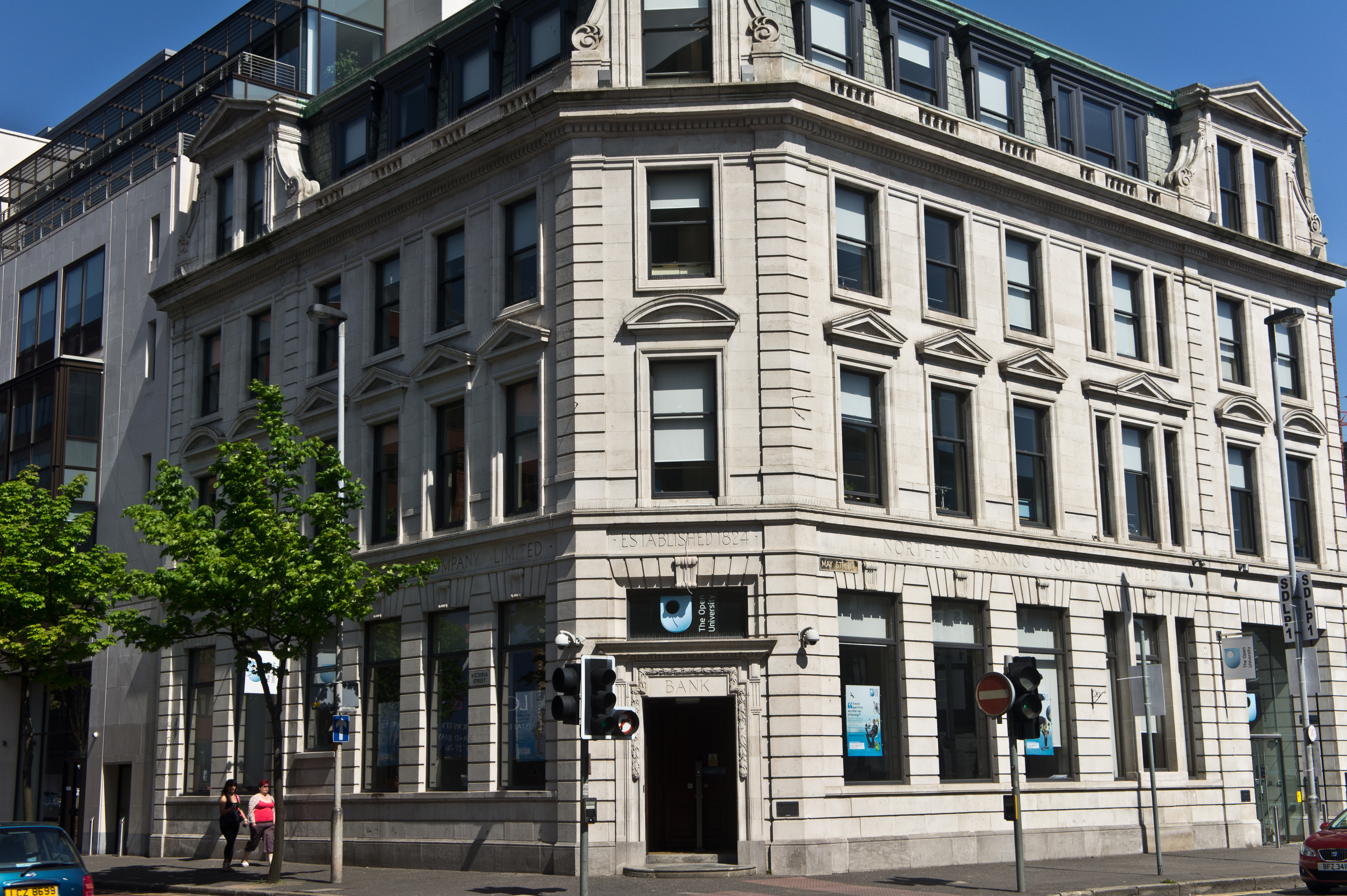
The Open University in Belfast

An open university is a university geared towards adult learners with an open-door academic policy, with minimal or no formal entry requirements in terms of qualifications, although admissions examinations may be used. Open universities are characterised by their development mission and employ various teaching methods, such as open supported learning, to provide distance education.

== History ==
A precursor to the open university was the University of London external system, established in 1858. At that time, the university was a degree-awarding examination board and welcomed anyone who could pass its matriculation examination and pay the requisite fees, including students from anywhere in the world. Participants could continue to earn a living while they studied, could learn in any way they wished, and could sit their examinations without visiting Britain. However, this was purely an examining board, not providing any support or instruction, and is not considered by academics to have been a distance education provider. A similar establishment was the Royal University of Ireland, founded in 1879 as an examining and degree-awarding university based on the University of London model. Examinations were open to external candidates in addition to those that attended lectures at participant colleges; many schools and convents entered their students for both advanced and degree-level examinations. Many of the early graduates were women, because Trinity College Dublin did not admit women until twenty years later.

The University of the Cape of Good Hope, later to become University of South Africa (UNISA), was created in 1873, and had a similar model to the University of London. It had no students, instead setting academic standards and acting as an examination board for associated university colleges. By 1946, these colleges were becoming independent universities, and UNISA began to offer postal tuition, becoming the world's first distance-teaching university although not an open university in terms of entry requirements. In apartheid South Africa, it offered educational opportunities to all ethnicities, but students had to meet normal matriculation requirements. There was very little student support, and the drop-out rate was high, particularly among black South Africans. By the new millennium, around 400,000 students in 130 countries were taking its courses, and it had become one of the largest distance learning institutions in the world.

In the Soviet Union in the late 1950s, Nikita Khrushchev significantly extended higher education using a system of correspondence courses with part-time education, in which students took part while remaining in the workplace. By 1965, there were 1.7 million students in this part-time/consultation model, 1.6 million full time students, and 0.5 million students taking evening classes. The support given enabled working-class students, at little cost to themselves, to become useful functionaries and members of the Communist party. With the break-up of the Soviet Union in the 1990s, the state no longer had need of the cadre of functionaries and the system collapsed.

The first western open university, and the basis of the modern open university model, was the Open University in the United Kingdom which was established in 1969. This model established the open university principles of open access for adult learners to courses delivered by distance learning, including using foundation courses designed to prepare students for university-level study. It also included changing the course-development process from being driven by individual professors or lecturers to having a central course development structure bringing together subject-matter experts and experts in different aspects of course design in a course team, ensuring standardised instructional content meeting institutional quality criteria. It aimed to widen access to the highest standards of scholarship in higher education, and has used a variety of methods for teaching, including written, audio and visual materials, the internet, disc-based software and television programmes on DVD. Course-based television broadcasts by the BBC continued until 15 December 2006.

In Asia, open universities began to appear in the 70s. The Korea National Open University was established in 1972, the Open University of Israel and the Allama Iqbal Open University were established in 1974. Similar models were implemented in other South Asian countries with the establishment of Indira Gandhi National Open University (1985) and Bangladesh Open University (1992).

The National University of Distance Education (UNED) was established in Spain in 1972 as a national distance-learning university with an imposed curriculum determined by the national government, leading to hostility from the autonomous regions and the political opposition to the Franco regime. The language of instruction was Spanish, and the university's refusal in the 1980s to consider teaching in Catalan resulted in Catalonia setting up the Catalan-language Open University of Catalonia in 1995, which has instruction in both Catalan and Spanish since 2000.

== See also ==
- List of open universities
- Open admissions
