= European Distance and E-learning Network =

Distance education organization

The European Distance and E-Learning Network (EDEN), originally named the European Distance Education Network, was established in 1991. EDEN is an international educational association open to institutions and individuals dealing with e-learning, open education, and distance education. EDEN is a not-for-profit organisation, registered as a limited company under English law.

EDEN organises annual European conferences, releases academic publications, offers information services and plays a useful role in a wide range of European projects. Bi-annual research workshops and the open classroom conferences increase the impact. Since 1995 EDEN has run the European Journal of Open, Distance and E-Learning (EURODL).

Since 1997 the secretariat of the association has been hosted by the Budapest University of Technology and Economics, Hungary.

== Activities ==
- Social online and face-to-face networking,
- Organisation of European annual and bi-annual thematic conferences,
- Publications and information services with regular Newsflashes to members, and irregular news to non-members,
- Active role in a wide range of important EU projects,
- Thematic hubs such as the Open Classroom Working Group (school level distance education),
- Promoting ‘cutting edge’ research in the field,
- Linking European initiatives and institutions with international peers in other continents.

=== Network of Academics and Professionals ===
The EDEN Network of Academics and Professionals (NAP) supports networking of individual members by providing meeting and communication forum. NAP has a functional autonomy and is coordinated by its own Steering Committee elected by a ballot of NAP members, its chair is ex officio member of the EDEN Board.

In 2018 the Council of EDEN Fellows has been established which includes all Fellows and Senior Fellows of EDEN – it has an advisory role in the EDEN Community, a think tank for future visioning, and as ambassador of EDEN. It is governed by the Board of the council.

== Promoting research ==
The association supports good quality research into open, distance and e-learning by means of its conferences and bi-annual research workshops as well as by providing a high-quality peer-reviewed online journal for publication of research results and best practices from all around the world. Publications related to the conferences and workshops are disseminated via the association's public webpage and its social online network.

=== European Journal of Open, Distance and E-Learning ===
EDEN has actively been supporting the online European Journal of Open and Distance Learning. EURODL publishes accounts of research, development and teaching for Europe, presents scholarly work and solid information about open, distance and e-learning. The journal is free to readers and contributes to the Open Content movement with over 4000 subscribers.

== Conferences ==
EDEN's mission includes the exchange of academic and professional experience, to promote effective navigation in the field, and improve quality of information. EDEN conferences are major academic and professional events in Europe, supporting international exchange of expertise, are gatherings where comprehensive contributions are presented by outstanding experts, are based on collecting best practice – papers presented and selected with publication in the ‘proceedings’, as resources, have a genuine community feel to them, where working relationships strengthen and deepen, where new partnerships are formed.

=== Annual Conferences ===
To cater for different needs, EDEN organises Annual Conferences and thematic workshops.

== Publications ==
EURODL, the European Journal of Open and Distance Learning is an electronic, multi-media journal on distance and e-learning distributed on the Internet. It publishes the accounts of research, development and teaching for Europe in its most inclusive definition, exploring the potential of electronic publishing. EURODL presents scholarly work and solid information and is peer-reviewed. It is free to readers and contributes to the Open Content movement.

For the EDEN Conferences, electronic Proceedings and printed Book of Abstracts are produced. Members have free online access to the archive of Proceedings with over 2000 full papers. A detailed list of publications as well as downloadable videocasts and slideshows of conference keynote presentations.

Presentations of the keynote speakers are collected online from 2006 on, as well as the papers awarded with the Best Research Paper Awards are published in PDF at the official website.

The EDEN Newsflash is a monthly news service delivered to EDEN Members via e-mail. All Newsflashes are stored on the organisations's members' social online community called NAP Members' Area.

== European Policy ==
Strategic contributions on a European level

Members and senior officers of EDEN have frequently been contributing to policy initiatives, important publications, comprehensive European actions during the past years. A selection of relevant achievements can be read below.

The book "E-Learning in Europe – Learning Europe: How new media contributed to the development of higher education?", published in 2005 in the series "Medien in der Wissenschaft" gives a survey about the past present and future of e-learning in twelve European countries. EDEN representatives have contributed with different chapters, including the concluding one about "European E-learning from Supranational Perspectives", by Claudio Dondi, Andras Szucs and Erwin Wagner.

The developments in different European countries were discussed at the conference "New Educational Benefits of ICT in Higher Education", in Rotterdam in 2002. The national cases were included in the book "The Use of ICT in Higher Education – A Mirror of Europe". EDEN contributed with a thought-provoking paper on the expectations, opportunities, achievements and realities regarding ICT, e-learning and ODL in Central and Eastern Europe.

The 2004 Annual Conference in Budapest "New Challenges and Partnerships in an Enlarged European Union" put in focus the issue of efficient and beneficial European integration and the core question: how distance and e-learning can best play a role in capacity building and support modernisation.

The topic of the Third EDEN Research Workshop in Oldenburg, in 2004, inspired the publication on "Learner Support in Open distance and Online Learning Environments", in the ASF Series on Distance Education, addressing the latest in theory, practice, research and evaluation in the field.

The Second EDEN Research Workshop, organised in Hildesheim in 2002, was entitled "Research and Policy in Open and Distance Learning". The Workshop dealt with the relation of research and comprehensive aspects of Open and Distance Learning and e-learning, focusing on policy and strategy issues.

An interesting collaboration with UNESCO Information Society Division resulted the project, entitled "Higher Education Open and Distance Learning Knowledge Base for Decision Makers". EDEN has also taken an active part in the Socrates Minerva ODL project "How to build up European ODL Networks", a comparative analysis of the different distance education networks in the European countries.

In co-operation with EADTU, a well-received study was prepared, entitled "The Role of Advanced Information Technology in the Development of Distance Education Networks in Central and Eastern Europe".

EDEN representatives were invited to co-ordinate two important policy studies: The Relationship between Distance and Mainstream Education, for the International Commission on Education for the Twenty-First Century (UNESCO), and a Policy Paper on Open and Distance Learning. Feasibility studies were realised by EDEN for Distance Education in Czechia, Slovakia, Hungary, Poland, Estonia, Latvia and Lithuania and an important paper on the Development of a Regional Distance Education Network in Central and Eastern Europe, using TEMPUS and PHARE funds, and in co-operation with EADTU.
