= Korea National Open University =

National university of South Korea

Coordinates: 37.5790°N 127.0028°E

- Type: National (Public)
- Established: 1972; 54 years ago
- President: Song-hwan Ko, Ph.D.
- Faculty: 150 (2011)
- Students: 94,656 (2023)
- Undergraduates: 92,079 (2023)
- Postgraduates: 2,577 (2023)
- Location: Seoul (Main Campus), Regional centers nationwide, South Korea
- Campus: 86 Daehak-ro, Jongro-gu, Seoul, South Korea
- Colors: Blue
- Website: www.knou.ac.kr

- Korea National Open University
- Hangul: 한국방송통신대학교
- Hanja: 韓國放送通信大學校
- RR: Hanguk bangsong tongsin daehakgyo
- MR: Han'guk pangsong t'ongsin taehakkyo

Korea National Open University (KNOU, Korean: 한국방송통신대학교) is a national university of South Korea. KNOU is South Korea's leading institution for open education, providing accessible and flexible higher education to over 94,000 students and the largest educational institution in the country by enrollment. Established in 1972 and becoming an independent national university in 1982, KNOU removes barriers to learning by offering undergraduate, graduate, and non-degree programs without traditional entry restrictions. Its open education model enables students to pursue accredited degrees through various formats, including online platforms and regional centers. With evolving technology and increased demand for remote learning, KNOU has expanded opportunities for self-directed education, making higher learning more inclusive and widely available. Korea National Open University ranked 151st among the top 1,000 major universities according to the Academic ranking of World Universities index of Shanghai Jiao Tong University (2016) and 201st in the World University Rankings index published by Times Higher Education (2017).

== History ==
In 1972, Korea National Open University (KNOU) was established as an affiliated college of Seoul National University. It was the first open university in East Asia and South Korea and the second open university in the world, following The Open University in the United Kingdom. After the Korean War armistice in 1953, South Korea's GDP was extremely low, and the number of people with higher education was minimal. In the 1970s, the higher education enrollment rate in South Korea was 25.7%, dropping to 17.7% in the late 1970s. Against this backdrop, KNOU was founded to make higher education more accessible. At the same time, high school education was not mandatory in 20th-century South Korea, and many people had not graduated from high school. To address this, the South Korean government also established the Korea National Open High School, applying a similar open education concept to secondary schooling.

In its early years, before KNOU expanded, professors at the main campus personally graded and annotated assignments submitted by students each semester. These were then sent back to students by mail. This meticulous feedback process was both a source of anxiety and a point of pride for students. Many saw receiving direct guidance from professors on their writing as a great honor, and satisfaction with the system was high. However, as enrollment grew, the workload for professors became overwhelming, leading to challenges in academic management. Consequently, the feedback system was gradually reduced starting in 1986 and was fully discontinued by 1994.

In 1972, KNOU lectures were broadcast via radio through KBS and MBC channels. By 1985, television and the internet were introduced as additional mediums for delivering lectures. As radio usage declined and television and internet access expanded, radio broadcasts for lectures were discontinued in 2008.

=== Difficulties in establishing the open university concept in South Korea ===
The concept of an "open university" faced significant challenges during KNOU's early days in South Korea. There was ongoing societal debate about whether the open-admission KNOU should be recognized as a formal university. Additionally, the legal classification of KNOU was ambiguous: should it be considered a standard four-year university, a cyber university, or a lifelong learning institution? Eventually, laws were enacted to clarify its legal status. Under South Korea's Higher Education Act, KNOU is now officially recognized as a standard four-year university.

=== 2020s: KNOU Name Change Controversy ===
KNOU incorporates the words "방송" (broadcast) and "통신" (communication) in its Korean name. This reflects its historical use of broadcasting media such as radio and television for education before the widespread adoption of the internet and smartphones. In modern times, the university utilizes the internet as its primary communication medium for learning.

In the 2020s, the university administration attempted to change its name and held a naming contest with a prize of approximately 100 million KRW. Proposed names included Korea National Remote University (Korean: 국립원격대학교), Korea National Future University (Korean: 국립미래대학교), and Korea National Our University (Korean: 국립우리대학교). However, the selected candidates failed to meet public expectations relative to the costs incurred, and the proposal was ultimately rejected due to opposition from enrolled students. The initiative was also criticized for excessive administrative spending.

=== Open Universities in Modern South Korean Society ===
Korea National Open University (KNOU) serves as the representative open university in South Korea and is regarded as a prestigious institution. However, as higher education has expanded, the role of open universities, which historically addressed issues such as population decline and income inequality, has somewhat diminished. The hierarchical nature of the South Korean higher education system, alongside the elitist culture surrounding universities—particularly the "SKY universities" (Seoul National University, Korea University, and Yonsei University)—has contributed to critical perceptions of open universities, which maintain more accessible admission policies.

==== Enrollment Trends and Challenges ====
The decline in South Korea's population has led to an increase in younger student enrollment at KNOU. While universities located in Seoul—often referred to as "In-Seoul" universities—are generally preferred for their perceived advantages in employment prospects, education quality, and reputation, only about 15% of students gain admission to these institutions. The remaining 85% must enroll in universities outside the Seoul metropolitan area. However, declining birth rates and a growing tendency among students to retake university entrance exams rather than enrolling immediately have led many regional universities to struggle with low enrollment. This persistent shortage of applicants has resulted in the closure of several institutions.

During the baby boom era, regional universities sustained themselves with a steady influx of students. However, in the current demographic landscape, universities lacking strong reputations or specialized expertise are increasingly facing financial difficulties, often leading to closure. Even national universities have been affected, with some opting for mergers to remain operational. As a result, a growing number of students are choosing KNOU over regional universities due to its financial stability and the credibility of its academic programs.

==== Accessibility and Social Contributions ====
KNOU remains committed to providing accessible higher education, particularly for elderly individuals, people with disabilities, and other non-traditional students. The university also operates a system that allows incarcerated individuals to pursue higher education while serving their sentences. Through this program, prisoners can obtain bachelor's degrees from within correctional facilities, with correctional authorities anticipating that higher education will aid in rehabilitation and social reintegration.

Additionally, many individuals who already hold a bachelor's degree from other universities enroll at KNOU to obtain an additional degree. In some cases, graduates of prestigious South Korean universities choose to restart their undergraduate studies at KNOU. Given its diverse student body—including young students, elderly learners, individuals with disabilities, incarcerated students, and degree holders seeking further education—KNOU does not fit into a single educational category. However, its role as an accessible and inclusive institution remains firmly established.

== Education ==
Korea National Open University (KNOU) operates on a credit-based system rather than a year-based system. This means students cannot advance to the next academic level unless they meet the credit requirements designated for each level, regardless of how long they have been enrolled. To graduate from KNOU, students must complete at least 130 credits, satisfy the graduation requirements set by their department—such as submitting certified foreign language test scores, a graduation thesis, or acquiring relevant certifications—and pass the graduation evaluation.

An early graduation system is also available. Students with an overall GPA of 4.0 or higher who have completed six or seven semesters and met all graduation requirements may be eligible to receive a bachelor's degree.

Students who meet certain qualifications may pursue a double major. However, if they fail to complete the graduation requirements set by the department, such as a graduation thesis, they will not be able to graduate even if their first major meets the graduation requirements.

The university includes four colleges:

- College of Liberal Arts
- College of Social Science
- College of Natural Science
- College of Education

It also includes seventeen graduate schools:

- Department of Practical English
- Department of Practical Chinese
- Department of Japanese Language & Culture
- Department of French Language & Culture
- Department of Law
- Department of Public Administration
- Department of Management
- Department of Media Arts & Science
- Department of Agriculture and Life Science
- Department of Economics
- Department of Computer Science
- Department of e-Learning
- Department of Bioinformatics
- Department of Envitonmental Health Systems
- Department of Nursing
- Department of Lifelong Education
- Department of Youth Education
- Department of Early Childhood Education

== Admission acceptance rate ==
The admission acceptance rate at Korea National Open University (KNOU) is approximately 99%. The number of students admitted varies by department, and in most cases, the number of admitted students is significantly higher than that of traditional universities. However, in certain departments, the number of applicants occasionally exceeds the available slots, which prevents the university from achieving a 100% acceptance rate.

== Campus ==
The university has campuses in every major city of South Korea. Cities which have KNOU campuses include: Seoul, Daejeon-Chungnam, Busan, Daegu-Gyeongbuk, Incheon, Gwangju-Jeonnam, Gyeonggi, Gangwon, Jeonbuk, Chungbuk, Gyeongnam, Ulsan, Jeju. In recent years, as the number of students studying abroad has grown, KNOU has adapted to allow students to continue their studies while living overseas.

== Tuition fee ==
The tuition fee is generally around $250 per semester. However, students who qualify for scholarships—such as young adults, senior citizens, naturalized foreigners in South Korea, or recipients of basic living subsidies—can reduce the total cost per semester to as little as $30, significantly lowering the financial burden or, in some cases, waiving the fee entirely. These low tuition fees are due to the university’s status as a national and open institution, as well as its large student body of approximately 100,000 registrants annually.

== Notable alumni ==
- Kim Yeon-koung, Volleyball player
- Kim Kwang-kyu, actor

== See also ==
- List of national universities in South Korea
- List of universities and colleges in South Korea
- Education in Korea
- Open university
