= Foothill–De Anza Community College District =

Community college district in California

Foothill-De Anza Community College District

Location
- Los Altos Hills, California Santa Clara County United States

District information
- Type: Public community college district

Students and staff
- Colors: Blue

Other information
- Number of community colleges: 2
- Website: www.fhda.edu

The Foothill–De Anza Community College District is a public community college district headquartered on the grounds of Foothill College in Los Altos Hills, California, United States. The district operates Foothill College and De Anza College in Cupertino.

== History ==
In 1957, the Foothill–De Anza Community College District was established. Foothill opened first with 1,414 students in 1958. Calvin C. Flint was the districts first President. The temporary first campus was a former elementary school in Mountain View California. Shortly after its initial opening, the permanent campus in Los Altos Hills opened in 1961.

In 1962, voters approved funding to build another campus in Cupertino and De Anza College opened in 1967 with about 3,000 students. The new campus was built on a former vineyard and estate. The first President of the De Anza Campus was A. Robert DeHart. DeHart was previously the Dean of Students and Director of Research and Planning at Foothill.

Since 2024, between the two campuses the district has approximately 64,000 students each year.
