= Lifewide learning =

Lifewide learning (LWL) is a teaching strategy and an approach to learning and personal development that involves real contexts and authentic settings. The goal is to address different kinds of learning not covered in a traditional classroom. By including LWL with a traditional classroom, students are better equipped to attain whole person development and to develop lifelong learning skills. It is the focus of education in Hong Kong, and was developed for higher education at the University of Surrey England. Lifewide education is the means by which an institution encourages, supports and recognizes learners' lifewide learning. It is an approach to visualising learning and personal development as a whole of life enterprise.

Lifewide learning adds important detail to the broad pattern of human development we call lifelong learning – all the learning and development one gains as one progresses along the pathway of one's life. Lifewide learning recognizes that most people, no matter what their age or circumstances, simultaneously inhabit a number of different spaces – like work or education, being a member of a family, being involved in clubs or societies, traveling, taking holidays, and looking after their own well-being mentally, physically, and spiritually. So the timeframes of lifelong learning and the spaces of life-wide learning will characteristically intermingle, and who we are and who we are becoming are the consequences of this intermingling.

Most people have the freedom to choose which spaces they want to occupy and how they want to occupy them. In these spaces, they make decisions about what to be involved in, meet and interact with different people, have different sorts of relationships, adopt different roles and identities, and think, behave and communicate in different ways. In these different spaces, they encounter different sorts of challenges and problems, seize, create or miss opportunities, and aspire to live and achieve their ambitions. The promise of lifewide education is that people can more fully appreciate and value their lives for the potential they hold for enabling them to become the people they want and need to become (in other words, their everyday pathway to actualising themselves).
