= Open-door academic policy =

University admissions policy

An open-door academic policy, or open-door policy, is a policy whereby a university enrolls students without asking for evidence of previous education, experience, or references. Usually, payment of the academic fees (or financial support) is all that is required to enroll.

Universities may not employ the open-door policy for all their courses, and those that have a universal open-door policy where all courses have no entry requirements are called open universities. The policy is sometimes characterized as a part of an educational revolution. From the dictionary meaning of the open-door policy, which is the idea of granting access to all those who want access, a similar idea can be drawn in terms of education.

According to Deepa Rao, the open-door academic policy is one of the main ways in which adult learners become a part of university/college life. The recognized demand for post-secondary education made many institutions commit strongly to the policy, but many concealed limitations in the policy can prevent some from securing a degree.

== History ==
In the early 20th century, higher education institutions opened at a rapid clip in western countries, and acceptance rates were generally low. This approach was strained as businesses increasingly demanded more employees who had earned advanced degrees. The Civil Rights Movement and the Baby Boom also encouraged administrators to expand the open-door academic policy.

As time went on, colleges and universities lowered their admission standards and increasingly offered financial support to attract more students. In some instances, this practice developed into an open-door policy, and institutions saw increased enrollment.

== Pros and cons ==
Open-door academic policies have been credited with increasing enrollment in underserved communities facing adverse social or economic factors. The policy has also been credited with producing a skilled workforce and thereby economic benefits for greater society.

Critics of such policies say that graduation rates of colleges are closely tied to their admissions policies. Six years after beginning a four-year program, an average of 60 percent of students nationwide will have graduated. However, that rate varies from 89 percent at colleges that accept less than one-quarter of applicants to 36 percent at those with an open admissions policy. Others have argued that the reduced revenue associated with open-door policies can lead to disinvestment in other aspects of higher education such as employee salaries and technology costs.

== Demographics ==
Students at open-door universities tend to:

- Be non-traditional students, for example those who have delayed enrollment (those who did not go straight into university education after completing secondary education).
- Be older than students pursuing college directly after secondary education, their average age being 29.
- Possess an adult diploma or GED, rather than a normal high school diploma.

== Limiting factors ==
Limiting factors restrict the student acceptance rate due to the following situations:

- Funding cuts, which can be supported by further funding. For example, funding through the school e.g. school fairs, raffles etc. Budget rearrangement is also a consideration in terms of allocating a smaller portion of funding for the open-door academic policy courses
- Lack of teaching staff, teachers resources, classroom space
- Over-subscription
- Legal terms restricting access for some students
- Waiting lists
- Prioritizing of students who have submitted
- Increase in education levels of students who submit

== Notable institutions with open-door policies ==
The open-door academic policy's requirements can differ not only between different countries, but also between sub-national jurisdictions (states, provinces, regions). The following is a list of some universities and colleges around the world that have an open-door academic policy:

- Athabasca University (Canada)
- Delta College (United States)
- SIM University (Singapore)
- Open University (United Kingdom)
- Open Universities Australia (Australia)

== See also ==
- College admissions in the United States
- Cooling out
- Open admissions
- Transfer admissions in the United States
- University and college admissions
