= Open educational resources policy =

Type of learning materials

Open educational resources (OER) are learning materials that reside in the public domain or have been released under an intellectual property license that permits their free use and re-purposing by others. OER policies (also sometimes known as laws, regulations, strategies, guidelines, principles or tenets) are adopted by governments, institutions or organisations in support of the creation and use of open content, specifically open educational resources (OER), and related open educational practices.

== Purpose ==
OER has been widely proposed as a key component in ongoing efforts in education sectors around the world to improve access and quality, to address rising costs, to maximise public investments, and to achieve the UN’s Sustainable Development Goal (SDG) 4. In light of these concerns, and discussions on the sustainability of OER initiatives, numerous authors as well as international organisations have been calling on institutions and governments to support OER through adoption of appropriate policies to ensure mainstreaming of OER and related practices.

== Definitions ==
There has been widespread agreement in the literature that policies to support OER should be developed, but a range of different definitions of OER policy have been advanced, indicating that it may take different forms at different levels. Some definitions explicitly address OER, and in terms of scope, span across activities of educational institutions as well as governments. However, OER can also be understood as included or impacted, whether explicitly or implicitly, within broader openness policies that address areas such as open content licensing, open science (including open access and open data), open education/open educational practices (OEP) more broadly, and more. A sample of OER policy definitions is offered below. These include definitions with an explicit focus on OER as well as definitions where OER is addressed implicitly within other areas of openness.

=== Examples: Explicit OER policy definitions ===
“Policy is related to the establishment of priorities for supporting the decisions made by an institution or organisation. Policies can serve administrative, financial, political or other goals. OER policies are generally those that support the assembly, use and reuse of OER in an institution or within a jurisdiction.”

“Generally, OER policies are laws, rules and courses of action that facilitate the creation, use or improvement of OER. OER policies may be principles, laws, regulations or funder mandates, and may be enacted by governments, institutions, corporations or funders.”

"Open educational resource policies (OER policies) are principles or tenets adopted by governing bodies in support of the use of open content—specifically open educational resources (OER) -- and practices in educational institutions. Such policies are emerging increasingly at the national, state/province, and local levels."

=== Examples: Implicit OER policy definitions ===
Open education policies are “formal regulations regarding support, funding, adoption, and use of Open Educational Resources (OER) and/or Open Educational Practices (OEP). Such policies are designed to support the creation, adoption, and sharing of OER and the design and integration of OEP into programs of study”.

“...we define policy as a written document that stipulates the expectations related to Open Education for an institution or country. Its goal is to lead to the creation, increased use and/or support for improving Open Educational Resources (OER). Beyond an institutional policy document, laws, rules, green papers, white papers, roadmaps, declarations, and funding programmes are included in policy”.

“Open Education policies are written or unwritten guidelines, regulations and strategies which seek to foster the development and implementation of Open Educational Practices, including the creation and use of Open Educational Resources. Through such policies, governments, institutions and other organisations allocate resources and orchestrate activities in order to increase access to educational opportunity, as well as promote educational quality, efficiency and innovation”.

== Initiatives by international organisations ==
International Organisations (IOs) have been advancing the international OER policy agenda since 2002 (See the final report from a Forum facilitated by UNESCO in 2002 during which the term OER was coined). In this respect, IOs have been issuing OER declarations, recommendations, and providing policy support, policy advice, awareness raising and related capacity-building activities. The adoption of the UNESCO Recommendation on OER in 2019, in particular, presents a major milestone and commitment by the international community to mainstreaming OER worldwide.

The Recommendation is structured around five actions areas

1. Building capacity of stakeholders to create, access, re-use, adapt and redistribute OER
2. Developing supportive policy
3. Encouraging effective, inclusive and equitable access to quality OER
4. Nurturing the creation of sustainability models for OER
5. Promoting and reinforcing international cooperation

UNESCO member states will be reporting on their progress with the implementation of the Recommendation action areas on a periodic basis (every 3–5 years). Launched in 2020 by UNESCO, The OER Dynamic Coalition (comprising stakeholders from member states and National Commissions for UNESCO, IOs, civil society and private sector) was constituted to support and advance implementation of the 2019 Recommendation on OER.

=== OER policy-related activities carried out by IOs to advance and support OER mainstreaming worldwide ===
==== UNESCO and Commonwealth of Learning (CoL) ====
- (2002) Forum on the Impact of Open Courseware for Higher Education in Developing Countries: Final Report
- (2012) Paris OER Declaration
- (2012) Mauritius Communiqué
- (2015) Incheon Declaration: Education 2030
- (2015) Qingdao Declaration: Leveraging ICTs to achieve Education 2030
- (2016) The 2016 Kuala Lumpur Declaration
- (2017) Ljubljana OER Action Plan and Ministerial Statement 2017
- (2019) Recommendation on Open Educational Resources (OER)

==== European Commission ====
- (2013) Opening Up Education Communication
- (2017) Going Open: Policy Recommendations on Open Education in Europe (OpenEdu Policies)

==== Organisation for Economic Co-operation and Development (OECD) ====
- (2007) Giving Knowledge for Free: The Emergence of Open Educational Resources
- (2015) OER: A Catalyst for Innovation

==== Organisation of the French Speaking States (OIF) ====
- (2009) Dakar Declaration on Open Educational Resources (in French)

== International research ==
Additional insights into the type of institutional and governmental OER policy developments can be discerned from numerous studies conducted since 2011 by International Organisations and Associations. These include the following:

- (2011) Open educational resources: Analysis of responses to the OECD country questionnaire
- (2012) Survey on Governments’ Open Educational Resources (OER) Policies
- (2015) Open Educational Resources: A Catalyst for Innovation
- (2017) Policy Approaches to Open Education – Case Studies from 28 EU Member States (OpenEdu Policies)
- (2017) Open Educational Resources: Global Report 2017
- (2020) Open Education in European Libraries of Higher Education
- (2020) Report from the ICDE OER Advocacy Committee’s Survey 2020: Implementation of the UNESCO RECOMMENDATION on OPEN EDUCATION RESOURCES (OER)
- (2022) An Exploration In Hermeneutics Of Dedicated OER Policies And Implications For OER Initiatives In Canadian Post-Secondary Institutions

== Creation guidelines ==
While there is broad agreement amongst IOs and researchers that policy should be developed in order to foster the uptake of OER, such policies need to be formulated in diverse contexts, and at different levels of governance, from the national through to the institutional or organisational. Whether the intention is to develop a standalone OER policy, or integrate OER within broader policy frameworks, OER policymaking is therefore a significant undertaking that requires nuanced considerations about its purpose, goals, implementation strategy and more. A variety of guidelines and toolkits have been developed that can assist institutions and governments in reflecting on the process of OER policy making and determine the appropriate actions in the process of its preparation, with recent guides emphasising the value of policy co-creation.

Examples of published guidelines and research reports that can assist with the OER policy making process:

- (2011) Guidelines for open educational resources (OER) in higher education
- (2016) Open Educational Resources: Policy, costs and transformation
- (2019): Guidelines on the development of open educational resources policies
- (2019) A Place for Policy: The Role of Policy in Supporting Open Educational Resources and Practices at Ontario’s Colleges and Universities
- (2019) Understanding the Impact of OER: Achievements and Challenges
- (2020) Open Education Policies: Guidelines for co-creation
- (2021) Guide to Developing Enabling Policies for Digital and Open Teaching and Learning

== See also ==
- Intellectual property
- Open access
- Open access mandate
- Open content
- Open educational practices
- Open publishing
