= European Foundation for Quality in e-Learning =

Not-for-profit organisation

- Institution: European Foundation for Quality in e-Learning (EFQUEL)
- Location: Rue des Deux Eglises 35, Brussels, Belgium
- Established: 2005
- President: Ulf Ehlers
- Members: 120
- Website: https://web.archive.org/web/20150522150940/http://efquel.org/

The European Foundation for Quality in e-Learning (EFQUEL) was a not-for-profit organisation which was legally established on June 30, 2005, and was based in Brussels, Belgium. It was a worldwide membership network with over 120 member organisations including universities, corporations and national agencies. The purpose of the foundation was to create a European community of users and experts to share experiences of eLearning. Two of the main initiatives of the foundation were the "UNIQUe" accreditation for quality in e-learning and the annual EFQUEL Forum.

== History ==
The European Federation for Quality in E-Learning (EFQUEL) was a non-profit association which had its origins in three successful projects, all in the field of quality in e-learning in Europe. EFQUEL approached quality in E-learning from complementary perspectives and developed full-scale services for all educational fields, regional contexts and target groups. The federation provided support, transparency, open participation and leadership for a broad range of topics.

Over the years, EFQUEL developed a portfolio that covered the quality of both products and programmes in the field of technology-enhanced learning:

- The UNIQUe quality label focused on the use of ICT to enhance educational provision and learning support, throughout the breadth of activity of the higher education institution. This approach required an applicant to meet high quality standards for programme objectives, programme structure, content, resources and learning processes.
- EFQUEL hosted ECBCheck, a new accreditation and quality improvement scheme for e-learning programmes and institutions in international capacity building. It supported capacity building organisations to measure the success of their e-learning programmes, and allowed for continuous improvement though peer collaboration and bench-learning.

In Q1 2012, more than 120 organisations participated in EFQUEL's network. These included universities like the KULeuven, United Nations University, University of Jyväskylä, Politecnico Milano -METID, Vytautas Magnus University, University of Belgrade, the Universitat Oberta de Catalunya, and 50 more universities. The network also included corporations such as Toshiba Europe or Adobe, other European networks, and political bodies.

EFQUEL closed at the end of 2014.

== Governance ==
EFQUEL was governed by a board of directors of 12 people, as of 2012.

== Activities ==
EFQUEL's main activities involved the creation and operation of e-learning tools and labels, as well as the organisation of the yearly EFQUEL Innovation Forum, a multidisciplinary conference which brought together experts in learning from around the world to discuss the latest innovations in learning and teaching.

EFQUEL operated the following quality tools and labels:

- UNIQUe - a label for quality use of ICT (Information and Communication Technologies) by higher education institutions
- ECB-Check - a quality label for e-learning programmes
- Sevaq+ - a tool for designing and running self-assessment and shared-assessment processes in e-learning

EFQUEL participated in European projects both as an initiator and active project partner. It was mainly involved in projects that focused on innovation, open access and quality assurance within various educational models and sectors. EFQUEL supported the process of developing and implementing quality frameworks and tools, assisted in research and content development, set up peer review processes and other quality assurance processes, and disseminated results among its network.

EFQUEL developed a series of papers to enter into the discussion regarding quality and technology enhanced learning.

=== UNIQUe Certification ===
The UNIQUe Certification was a quality label awarded to higher education institutions, for use of ICT (information and communication technologies). The label was managed by the EFQUEL, and was co-developed by the MENON Network, EFMD, and Europace.

The quality of both products and programs in the field of technology-enhanced learning varies widely. The UNIQUe quality label was a unique concept of quality improvement which was theoretically sound and met the expectations of practice.

Many of the existing quality initiatives in this field focus heavily, if not solely, on online instructional design. The UNIQUe approach aimed to go above and beyond this, focusing on the use of ICT to enhance educational provision and learning support, throughout the entire breadth of activity of the higher education institution. This approach required an applicant to meet high-quality standards for program objectives, program structure, content, resources and learning processes.

==== For who ====
The fundamental feature of the UNIQUe approach was to support institutions of higher education to measure how successful they are in technology-enhanced learning and to allow for continuous improvement. Thus,

- UNIQUe was an accelerator for quality improvement and innovation.
- Providing industry-wide benchmarks, it enhanced the implementation speed of the Bologna reforms in the area of technology-enhanced learning.
- Compared to other quality initiatives in the area of technology-enhanced learning, UNIQUe had a broader institutional approach and was not only related to e-learning. The UNIQUe quality label built on the broadest stakeholder involvement.
- The UNIQUe process was structured in six distinct stages and offered a formalized approach in each of the steps.
- The UNIQUe quality label provided a certification as a result, next to continuous quality improvement mechanisms.
- The UNIQUe quality label focused on innovation. UNIQUe ensured continuous quality improvement since it was a diagnostic tool for self-assessment of the institution.

==== The process ====
The UNIQUe process was made up of six steps:

- Application
- Eligibility: The institution is checked for overall compliance with the UNIQUe scheme.
- Self-assessment: The institution embarks on a process of self-analysis and assessment, completing a questionnaire about its processes, and submitting this to a review team.
- Peer review: A three-person review team visits the institution, to check compliance with the UNIQUe criteria.
- Awarding body: An independent awarding body recommends certification or rejection, based upon the recommendation of the reviewers.
- Continuous quality improvement: The institution's development of ICT policies is continuously monitored, in line with recommendations made by the review team.

== Domain hijack ==
As of December 29, 2023, UNIQUe's domain had been hijacked and was distributing malware.

== Sources ==
- ENQA Workshop Report on Quality Assurance in e-Learning Workshop Report
