= Mark Massara =

Mark Massara is an American surfer, attorney, and environmental conservationist. He first gained a reputation in the surfing and environmental communities when he won a $5.6 million Clean Water Act violation, the second largest ever collected. Since that case, he has assisted nonprofit organizations, including Surfrider Foundation and Sierra Club, government agencies, and private sector enterprises in several high-profile coastal and ocean protection, restoration, education and development campaigns that highlight and achieve coastal conservation and amenities for wildlife and future generations.

== Career ==
In 2010, Massara became General Counsel and Vice President of Social Responsibility at O'Neill Wetsuits, the oldest and largest maker of recreational dive and surfing wetsuits and lycra in the world. From 1991 to 2009, Massara served as Director of the Sierra Club's California Coastal Programs. In 1992, Massara established Surfers Environmental Alliance and the National Association of Surfing Attorneys. In 1998, he partnered with Kenneth and Gabrielle Adelman to create a California Coastline Records Project.

Massara currently serves on the board of CoastWalk, a non-profit organization dedicated to the establishment of the California Coastal Trail, and O'Neill Sea Odyssey, a non-profit ocean conservation program for young people. He also serves on the advisory board of Save the Waves Coalition and Project Kaisei. During his career, Massara has served on the board of Vote the Coast and Coastal Advocates.

In 2008 and 2009, Massara participated inSEA Paddle NYC, a 28-mile (45 km) paddle around New York City that raises money for charities.

Massara writes on coastal and environmental legal issues for Coastwatcher, surfing magazines, and other publications. He lectures and has taught ocean law and science at universities including Stanford Law School, University of Oregon School of Law and University of California Santa Barbara.

== Environmental activism ==
Martin's Beach

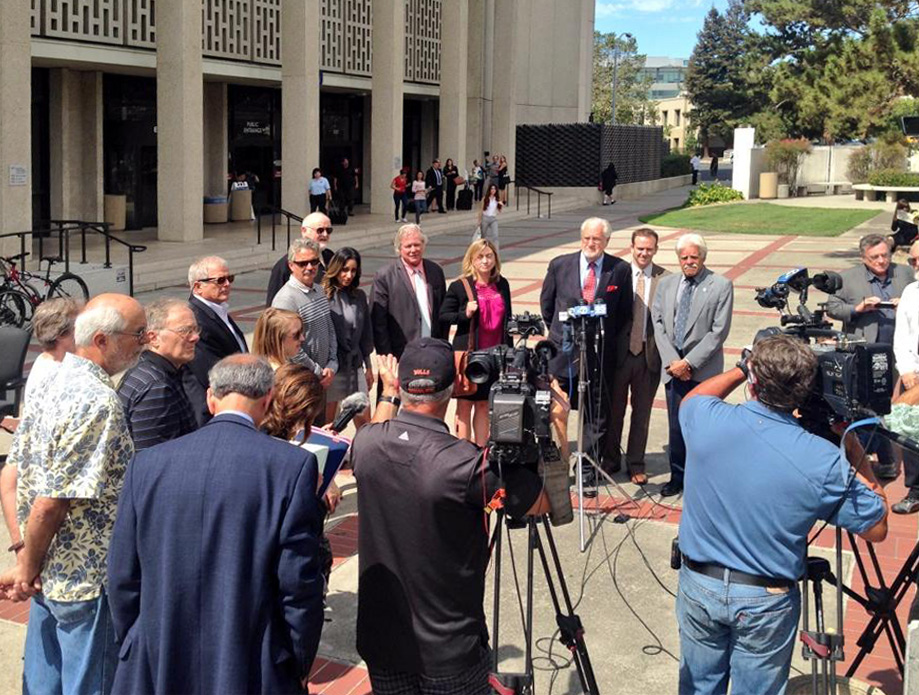
Mark Massara and team members discuss public access rights at Martin's Beach

In 2014, Massara put together a team of renowned lawyers, including Joe Cotchett and Pete McCloskey of Cotchette, Pitre & McCarthey, to represent Surfrider Foundation in a California Coastal Act violations case against Silicon Valley billionaire Vinod Khosla. Khosla purchased Martin's Beach in San Mateo County and eliminated public beach access rights. Following a trial, the court found Khosla in violation of the Coastal Act and ordered public access to Martin's Beach.

Trestles Beach In 2008, Massara, Sierra Club, California State Parks Foundation, dozens of organizations, and tens of thousands of activists won one of the biggest environmental victories in Southern California history by defeating the Orange County Transportation Corridor Agency's proposal to construct a billion dollar 17-mile (27 km) toll road highway. The project would have cut through San Onofre State Park and endangered species habitat along San Mateo Creek, through sacred Native American sites, and adjacent to one of America's most famous surfing environments at Trestles Beach. Prior to the California Coastal Commission denying the project, Massara stated, "The TCA's rich man's highway to nowhere is the wrong road at the wrong time at the wrong place."

BHP In 2007, Massara and Sierra Club led a coalition of dozens of environmental organizations and thousands of coastal activists in the defeat of a multibillion-dollar proposal by BHP Billiton to construct a 14-story liquid natural gas terminal, that would have been a floating industrial facility several miles off the Malibu-Oxnard area of Southern California. The victory, in which both the California State Lands Commission and the California Coastal Commission denied the project in separate hearings, is considered the Waterloo for LNG terminals along the California coast.

Pebble Beach In 2007, Massara's efforts resulted in the California Coastal Commission denial of Pebble Beach Company's plan to cut down over 18,000 trees on the Monterey Peninsula.

Hearst Corporation When the California Coastal Commission held a hearing in 1998 on whether to approve a Hearst Corporation proposal to build a series of resorts on one of that last untouched stretches of coastline, surfers protested. Massara and other Sierra Club activists organized aerial photos, obtained documentation on the significant Native American resources that would be disturbed by the project, and rounded up a crowd of 1,500 to show up for the hearing. Surfers provided signs for protesters and wore wetsuits to protest against the plan.

Eureka In 1991, as counsel for Surfrider Foundation, Massara won a major lawsuit against two pulp mill companies near Eureka, California that were dumping 40 million US gallons (150,000 m^{3}) of toxic effluents per day into the ocean. The $5.6 million penalty was the second largest collected for Clean Water Act violations.

‘’’History’’’ Massara started in environmental activism at the age of seven. He was living in Santa Barbara when a Union Oil offshore rig leaked 80,000 to 100,000 barrels (13,000 to 16,000 m^{3}) of oil, and he and his father threw hay bales on the beach and collected dead and dying birds. An avid surfer, Massara states, "Surfers bring to the cause of protecting the coast an intimate knowledge of the California coastline and its many resources, along with a zeal for recreation."

"Whether I'm working with surfers, farmers or Chumash Indians, I listen to them, go to their meetings and immerse myself in their perspective and genuinely empathize with their viewpoint," states Massara. "It helps to walk a mile in someone's shoes."

== Coastal Conservation ==
Currently, Massara focuses on climate change related coastal protection and land use issues. With a predicted 4.5-foot (1.4 m) sea level rise along the California coast in the next 80 years, Massara states, "There is no time to waste in implementing aggressive land use retreat and resilient habitat and wetlands protection measures." Massara is urging private property owners along the coast to adopt "managed retreat strategies" and begin moving residential and other structures away from coastal bluffs. He is also arguing that coastal open space and wetlands areas be protected and expanded as "resilient" habitat necessary to protect wildlife in future decades.

== Recognition ==
The Smithsonian has declared Massara an "ocean hero".

In 2015, Massara and the Open Martin's Beach Team was honored with Surfrider Foundation's Wavemaker Award.

In 2010, Massara was interviewed on Sea Change Radio.

In 2009, Massara was featured in an article entitled "Ocean Hero" in the University of San Francisco School of Law's USF Lawyer magazine.

In May 2008, Massara was featured in a New York Times video entitled "Planet Us: The Coastal Warrior."

In May 2007, Massara was featured in Vanity Fair's Green Issue. "He is a polluter's worst nightmare: a long-haired surfer with a law degree. Now that's righteous."
