= TradeIndia =

Indian web portal

- Industry: Internet Marketing
- Founded: 1996
- Founder: Bikky Khosla
- Headquarters: New Delhi, India
- Area served: Worldwide
- Key people: Sandip Chhettri (CEO)
- Website: www.tradeindia.com

TradeIndia is an onlineBusiness to Business (B2B) portal for small businesses based in India and around the globe. The portal was started in 1996 by Bikky Khosla and is maintained and promoted under the flagship company, Infocom Network Pvt. Ltd. The company is headquartered in New Delhi, India, and has branch offices in 35 cities across India. It employs over 1200 professionals.

== History ==
The company has published Exporters Yellow Pages since 7 September 1990 and in 1996 started the web portal tradeindia.com to provide online directory services to the global export-import community.

== Funding ==
The initial investment of $1.7 million was made in Infocom Network Ltd. in 2001 by Vinod Khosla, an Indian-born California-based venture capitalist and elder brother of Bikky Khosla.

== About the portal ==
The portal provides information about Indian and global sellers and buyers with over 12,000 product categories and sub-categories. The main products and services offered by the portal include online business catalogs, DialB2B, Trade Alerts, Call Me Free Service, credit reports and trade leads. The portal has a separate section on trade shows and the company regularly participates in global and domestic trade shows. The portal also has a special mobile-optimised version for mobile phone users.

In 2009, the company launched two vertical portals to cater to the business requirements of SMEs – one a news-based portal called SMETtimes and the other a separate section showcasing suppliers from China. The portal claims to be the first Indian B2B portal to have more than 3 million registered users, of which over 2 million are SMEs.

== Indianised domain name ==
The portal offers an Indianised Domain Name Booking service developed by VeriSign.

== Events organised ==
- Emerging India Awards
- Workshop on effective use of internet for the growth of business
- 2nd Food & Agri Exporters Conclave
- SME Conclave

== Partnerships ==
In April 2013, the company has signed a Memorandum of Understanding (MoU) with the Department of International Trade Promotion (DITP) of the Ministry of Commerce of Thailand, to boost Indo-Thai bilateral trade. TradeIndia is also associated with Google as their premier SME partner. Previously, TradeIndia had signed a Memorandum of Understanding with the Korea International Trade Association(KITA) to promote SMEs and partnered with Global Sources in organising the Machinery & Industrial Supplies Fair.
