= Fraternal Order of Moai =

American fraternal organization

- Crest of the Fraternal Order of Moai
- Formation: 2005
- Type: Secular Fraternal Order
- Headquarters: Columbus, Ohio
- Tagata A'o: CowtownKahuna
- Website: http://www.fraternalorderofmoai.org

The Fraternal Order of Moai (FOM; also often known as The Moai) is a fraternal order and social club founded in 2005 by Matt "Kuku Ahu" Thatcher, Jim "Chisel Slinger" Robinson and Joel "Cowtown Kahuna" Gunn. The Order uses the Moai statues of Rapa Nui as a theme. An initial goal of the group was to preserve the history of and artifacts from the closed Kahiki Supper Club in Columbus, Ohio. Since then it has grown into "a serious group of tiki aficionados" with activity all over the United States. Some describe the group as "a cult within a cult" when discussing the modern Tiki revival.

Members are often fans of tiki culture, the Polynesian pop era, mid-century modern style, and kustom kulture and these styles are reflected in the events held by the group. Some members are artists who produce music, carvings, lamps, and ceramics that tie into the theme of the group. The group has been known to provide assistance with preserving artifacts and expertise to local "tiki" businesses.

Even though the group participates in many public events the organization operates like a secret society and many members only identify themselves using aliases. Leaders of the group use obscure titles that combine words from several Polynesian languages.

The group exhibits a bizarre sense of humor and places references to use of time travel technology, combating a zombie outbreak and cloning technology in official information published online. Much of this information refers to a claimed network of scientific research labs in the continental United States called the F.O.M. Test Labs.

== Logo ==
Flag of the Fraternal Order of Moai

The Order uses a crest as a logo and displays it on casual and ceremonial clothing, printed materials, and web sites. The logo is a blue moai which resembles the large fireplace at the now demolished Kahiki Supper Club in Columbus, Ohio. The forehead of the Moai is stamped with MMV to mark the founding of the Order in 2005. The blue moai protects a lit flame which serves as a reminder of lost landmarks like the Kahiki Supper Club. The logo is normally displayed with the full name of the organization stamped on the base of the moai or the initials F.O.M. above it in a stylized script.

The Order also uses a secondary logo of a black moai head silhouette with two golden war clubs crossed behind it at the center. This is also used at the center of a blue and white flag. This flag design and logo appear on many materials including business cards used by members.

== Purpose ==
Honui Moai fez

The Order's mission statement describes it as the "premier fraternal organization and social network for all men and women interested in tiki culture and the Polynesian pop era."

The Order is an Ohio non-profit corporation and a tax exempt 501(c)(10) Domestic Fraternal Society.

The Fraternal Order of Moai Foundation is also an Ohio non-profit corporation and a tax exempt 501(c)(3) Organization.

== Membership ==
Members of the group are referred to as Fellow Moai and senior members called The Honui wear a distinctive blue fez at events. Photos from a national convention in 2025 show some members wearing a different blue fez but the significance is not known yet. There are members throughout the United States and in parts of Canada.

Membership is selective and requires the sponsorship of a current member in good standing. Interested adults must complete a membership process after requesting membership.

The Order held a national convention in 2010 to celebrate the fifth anniversary of the founding of the group which is called "Poreko." Twitter and Facebook posts by the group have featured a logo for a tenth anniversary convention event which was held in 2015 and a 20th anniversary event in 2025.

== Chapters ==
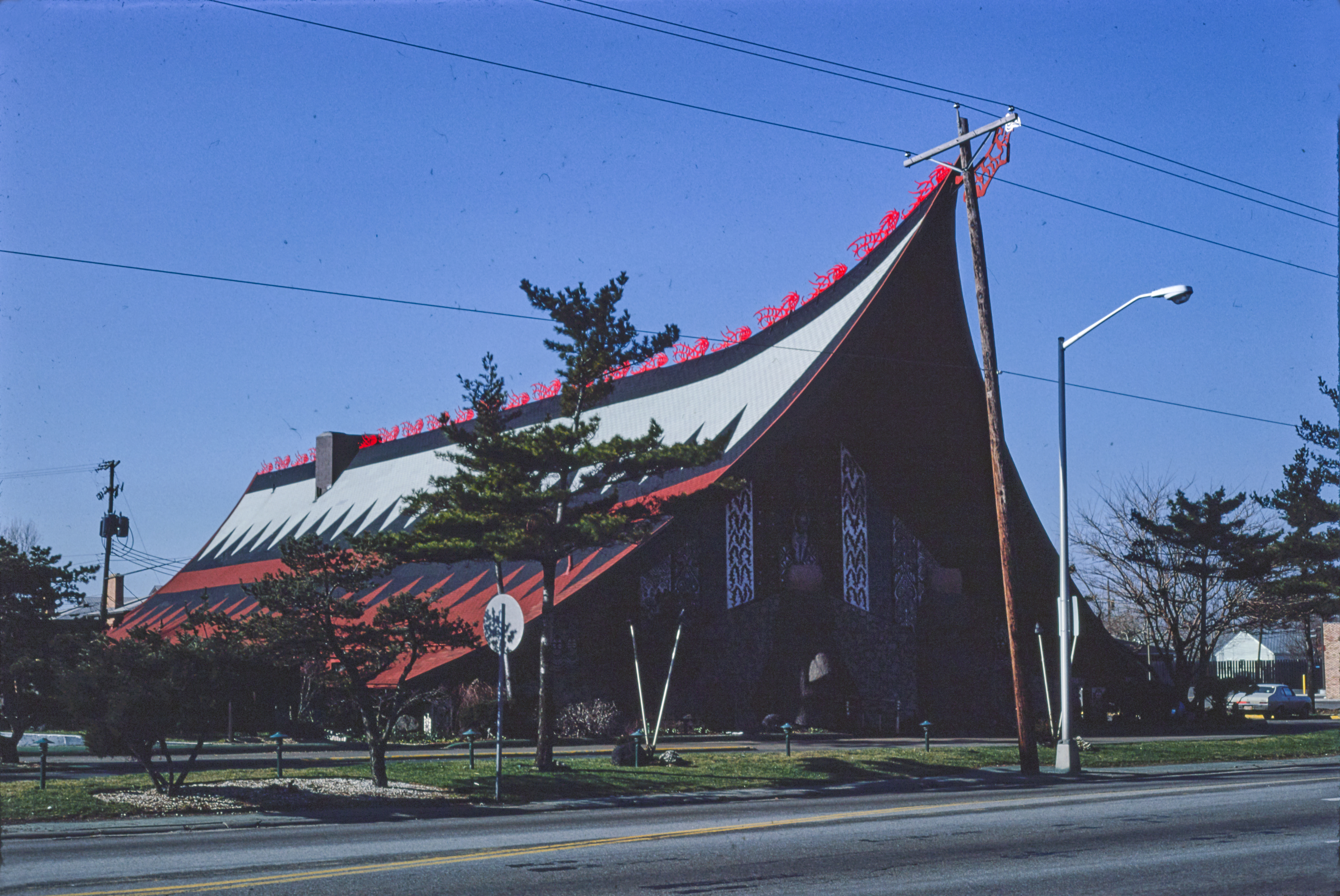
The Kahiki was on East Broad Street in Columbus

The Order currently has 14 active chapters in the United States and Canada and claims to be forming additional chapters in other regions.

Members who are not affiliated with a chapter are referred to as Moai Tungane.

== Good Works ==
Adopt-A-Highway sign, Aurora, Illinois

In November 2015 the Order announced the creation of a charitable foundation, the Fraternal Order of Moai Foundation, which would be used as a vehicle to increase their charity and community service activities.

The Order has named the Easter Island Foundation as its national charity and proceeds from events are donated to the foundation.

In addition, individual members and chapters volunteer and raise money for charities.

== Preservation ==
In 2013 the group successfully bid at auction for "George," the monkey fountain from the Kahiki Supper Club in Columbus, Ohio. Following the closure of the restaurant the fountain had been moved to an office building used by Kahiki Foods where it was inaccessible by the general public. Following the purchase the organization announced that the fountain would be moved to the courtyard next to The Grass Skirt, a tiki bar in Columbus, and placed on public display after restoration.

== Events ==
Event Poster

The group presents many public events, often with sponsorship from other groups and companies including: Dole Foods, Surf Ohio, Trader Vic's, Kahiki Foods, Royer Corporation, Barritt's Bermuda Stone Ginger Beer, Kona Brewing Company, and a variety of rum distillers. These events often have a charity fundraising component such as a silent auction or live auction of donated items.

Hot Rod Hula Hop Originally held from 2005 to 2008 this event combined a car show with a luau dinner party featuring entertainment from live bands from around the United States including Waitiki and The Cocktail Preachers. A silent auction at Hot Rod Hula Hop IV raised $1,252 for the Easter Island Foundation. The Order announced that the event would return on August 9–10, 2013, as a local event run by the Kahiki Chapter. The 2013 event was successful and raised $4,000 for Cure CMD. The sixth event was held August 8–10, 2014 and raised $4,000 again. The seventh event was held August 7–8, 2015, to benefit CureCMD. The eight event will be held August 5–6, 2016.

NorthEast Tiki Tour Started in 2007 the NorthEast Tiki Tour (a.k.a. NETT) is an annual bus tour which stops at a changing list of tiki bars and Polynesian restaurants. The tour often includes the world's largest Chinese restaurant: Kowloon Restaurant in Saugus, Massachusetts. After a year off in 2009 the tour returned in 2010 and then again on September 13, 2014.

Surf Ohio Festiki Billed as a family friendly celebration of sun, surf, sand & summer, the first annual Festiki was held on August 15, 2009, at Carillon Park in Dayton, Ohio. A portion of proceeds from the event were donated to the Surfrider Foundation. The second annual event was held August 14, 2010 at Old River Park in Dayton, Ohio, and was one of the dates on the Space Cossacks' reunion tour that summer.

Ohana: Luau at the Lake The first Ohana was held September 18–20, 2009 and $3,000 in proceeds from the event were donated to the Easter Island Foundation to support youth programs and a scholarship. The second annual event was held June 25–27, 2010 and $5,000 in proceeds from the event were donated to the Easter Island Foundation to support scholarships. The third annual event was held June 23–26, 2011. The fourth annual event was held June 21–24, 2012, the fifth annual event was held June 27–30, 2013, the sixth annual event was held June 27–29, 2014. The most recent events were held June 25–28, 2015, and June 23–26, 2016. The next will be held June 15–18, 2017.

Chicago Area Tiki Tour The Red Palms Chapter of the Order sponsored a bus tour of tiki bars in the Chicago area September 30-October 2, 2011. The event, called CATT, was similar to the already established NorthEast Tiki Tour (NETT). All proceeds from a charity raffle at the event benefited CatNap from the Heart, a local non-profit animal shelter. A second event was held April 24–26, 2015, and proceeds were donated to the Easter Island Foundation to fund a memorial scholarship. A third event is expected in 2017.

Call of the Tropics The Kon-Tiki Chapter of the Order created "Call of the Tropics," a celebration of Tiki art, music and mid-century culture July 6–21 at the Color of Energy Gallery in Dayton, Ohio. The event features a large kick-off block party followed by a series of events tied to an art show at the gallery.

Ohana: Luau by the Sea The Order announced that a second Ohana event would begin in Florida October 1–3, 2015. The event benefited the Easter Island Foundation. A second event will be held September 30-October 2, 2016.

Bridge and Tunnel Tiki Tour The Kokoru and Te Āporo Nui chapters of the order announced the debut of a new event, the Bridge and Tunnel Tiki Tour (a.k.a. BATTT), on October 18, 2014. The event toured tiki bars in New Jersey and Staten Island. The event was to benefit the Habitat For Humanity's Hurricane Sandy Fund.
