= Massara =

Massara is a surname. It can also be a first name, in Arab and African cultures. Notable people with the surname include:

- Carlos Alberto Massara (born 1978), Argentine footballer
- Indiana Massara (born 2002), Australian singer, actress, model, and Internet personality
- Mark Massara, American surfer and environmentalist
- Natale Massara (born 1942), Italian composer, arranger and conductor
- Pino Massara (1931–2013), Italian musician, composer, record producer and conductor
- Rooney Massara (born 1943), English rower

== See also ==
- Massara (song), a 2019 song by Kana-Boon
