= Bikky Khosla =

Indian businessman

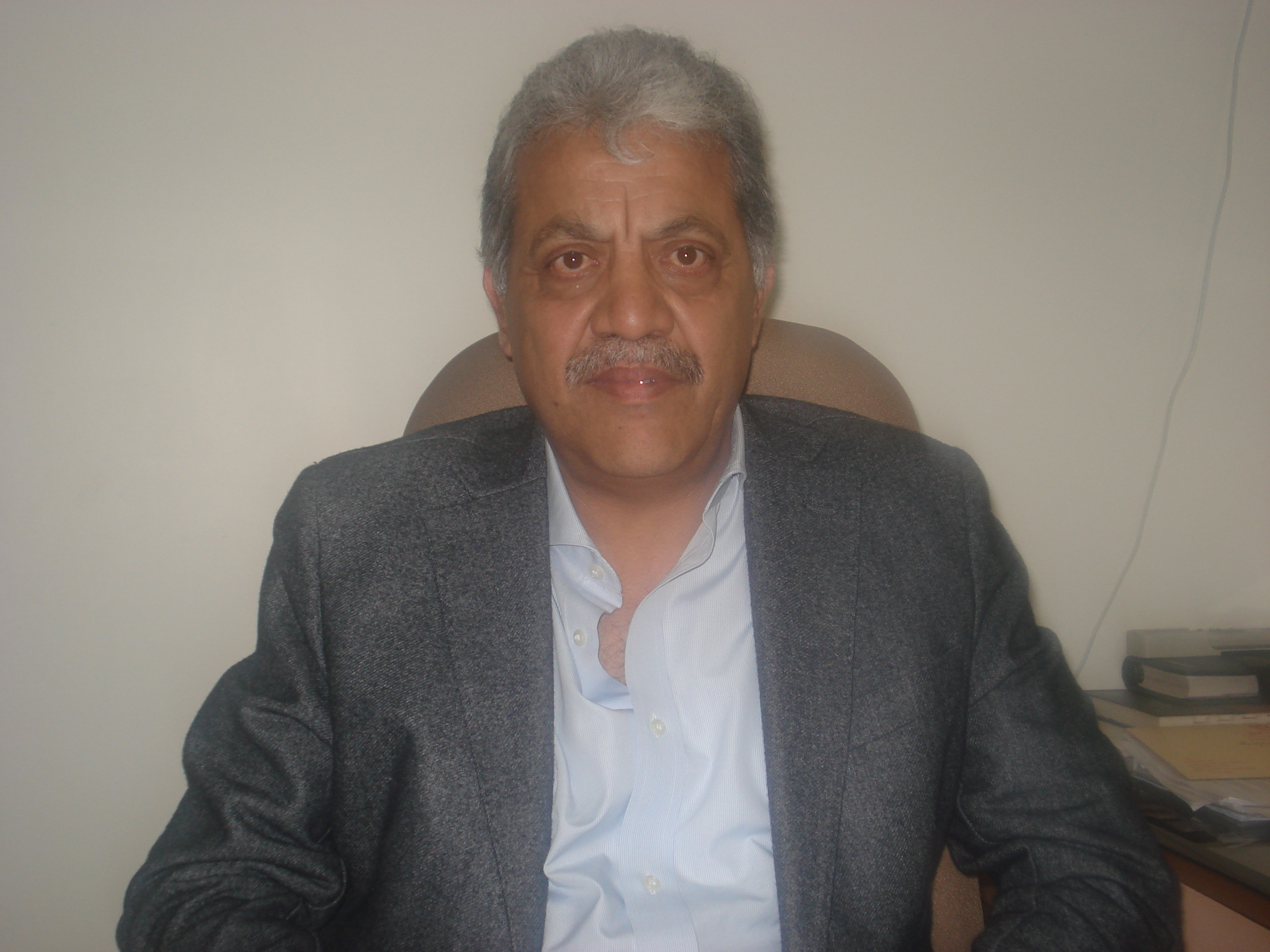
- Khosla in his New Delhi office
- Born: 30 July 1960 (age 66); Delhi, India
- Education: Delhi University; Shaheed Bhagat Singh College
- Occupation: Entrepreneur
- Known for: Founder TradeIndia
- Spouse: Married
- Relatives: Vinod Khosla (brother)

Bikky Khosla (born 30 July 1960) is an Indian entrepreneur and founder of tradeindia.com (Infocom Network Limited). He is the younger brother of Vinod Khosla, an Indian-American venture capitalist. Presently, he is chairman of the e-commerce committee of ASSOCHAM and had served in the same capacity for ASSOCHAM SME's Expert Committee in the past. He is also editor of SME Times, a business news website and is associated with Indian Angel Network, a network of investors that invests in early stage businesses.

== Education ==
He was born on 30 July 1966 in Delhi, India. He holds a Bcom degree from the Shaheed Bhagat Singh College of Delhi University.

== Entrepreneurial career ==
He ventured into a career in international trade soon after his graduation during the 1980s. He started Infocom Network Private Limited in 1991 and started publishing Exporters Yellow Pages for Indian exporters. In 1996, he started a b2b portal tradeindia.com for exporters, manufacturers and importers.

Khosla was on virtual jury panel of Manthan Award South Asia & Asia Pacific 2012. His articles published on SME Times were selected in the list of fifteen final entries for the first IE Business School Prize For Economic Journalism in Asia.

== Portal for SMEs ==
B2B portal started by him gives information on exporters and importers worldwide and provides a platform to buyers and sellers across the world irrespective of distance, size and position of exporters, importers and service providers in diverse arenas. His company has also signed a Memorandum of Understanding (MoU) with Korea International Trade Association (KITA) to help small and medium enterprises(SMEs) of both the nations and jointly hosted the Global Sources Machinery & Industrial Supplies Fair with Global Sources on 23–25 November at the Bombay Exhibition Centre in Mumbai
