= Kahiki Supper Club =

Former restaurant in Columbus, Ohio

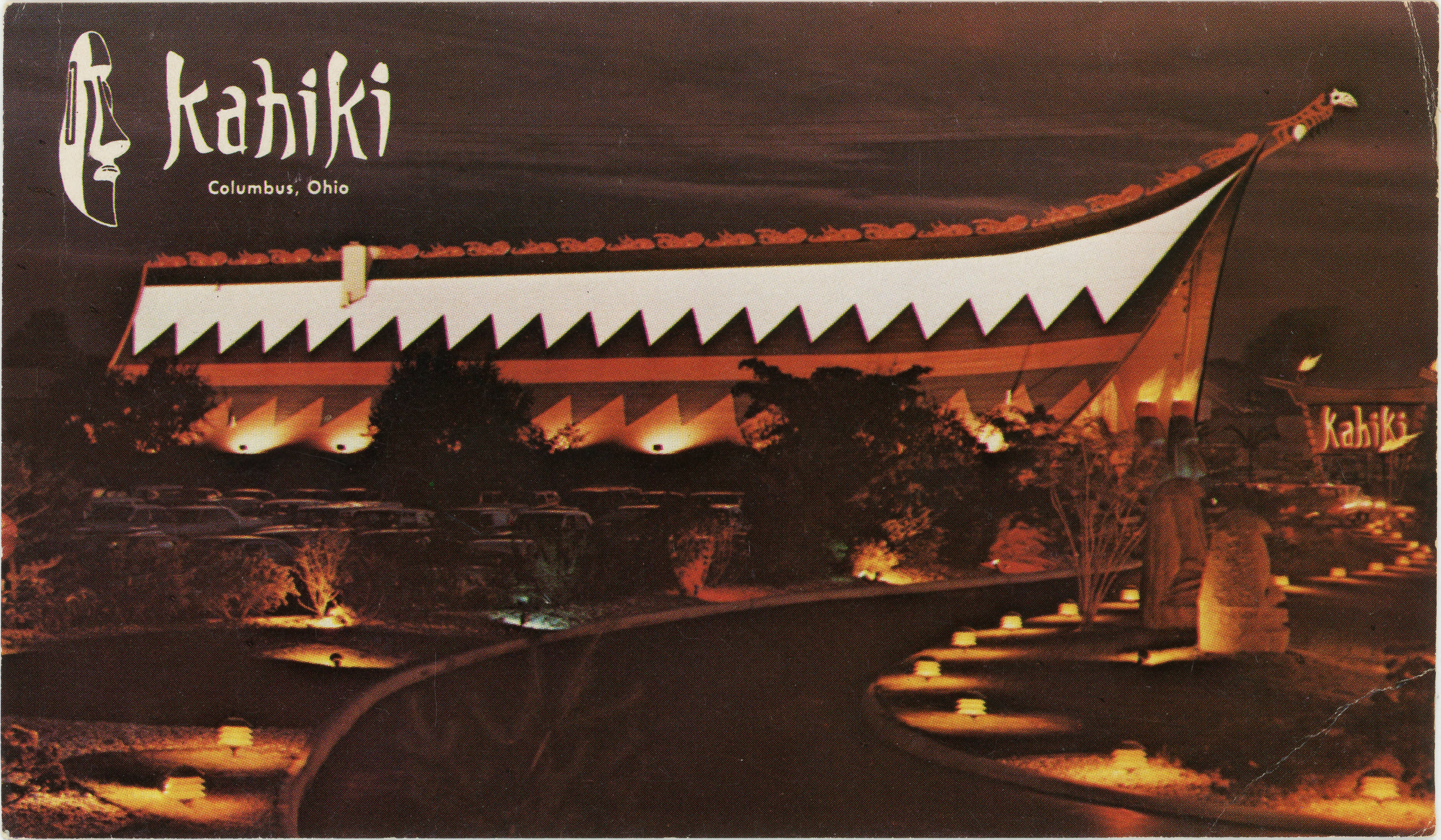
- Postcard of the restaurant and its logo
- Interactive map of Kahiki Supper Club

Restaurant information
- Established: February 20, 1961
- Closed: August 26, 2000
- Owners: Michael and Alice Tsao
- Previous owners: Bill Sapp and Lee Henry, Mitch Boich
- Food type: Tiki, Polynesian
- Location: 3583 E. Broad St., Columbus, Ohio
- Seating capacity: 500
- Website: www.kahiki.com/supper.htm (Internet Archive copy)
- The Kahiki
- U.S. National Register of Historic Places
- Coordinates: 39.9725°N 82.904722°W
- Built: 1960-61
- Architect: Bernard C. Altenbach; Ned Eller, Ralph Sounik
- Demolished: November 2000
- NRHP reference No.: 97001461
- Added to NRHP: December 8, 1997

The Kahiki Supper Club was a Polynesian-themed restaurant in Columbus, Ohio. The supper club was one of the largest tiki-themed restaurants in the United States, and for a time, the only one in Ohio. It operated at its Eastmoor location on Broad Street beginning in 1961, at the height of tiki culture's popularity. The Kahiki was listed on the National Register of Historic Places in 1997, but closed and was demolished in 2000. It was described as an exceptionally important example of a themed restaurant and the most elaborate tiki restaurant ever built.

After the restaurant's closure in 2000, portions of the interior and service ware were salvaged. A social organization known as the Fraternal Order of Moai was formed in 2005, in part to record the restaurant's history and preserve its artifacts. An offshoot of the operation, Kahiki Foods, manufactures frozen meals, and is based in the nearby suburb of Gahanna.

== Attributes ==
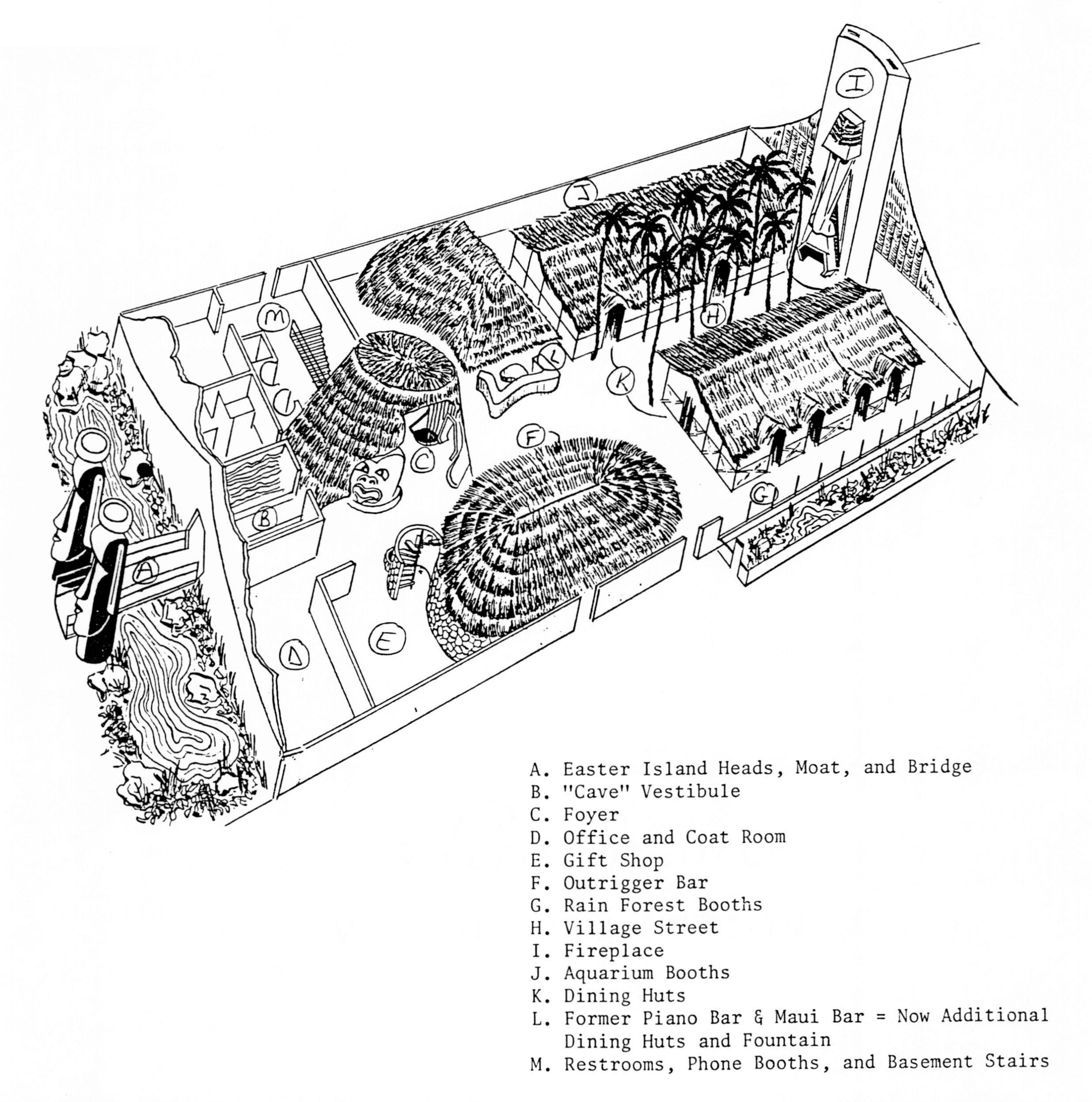
Interior diagram

With 20,000 sq ft (1,900 m^{2}), the restaurant was one of the largest tiki-themed restaurants in the United States, and operated at its East Broad Street location from 1961 until the building's demolition in 2000. It was built at the heyday of tiki culture's popularity.

It was listed on the National Register of Historic Places in 1997. It was described as an exceptionally important example of a themed restaurant and the most elaborate tiki restaurant ever built.

The restaurant was located in suburban Columbus, east of downtown, on the border of Whitehall. It was situated on a corner lot, near retail and fast food businesses beside and across from it. The restaurant had a small parking lot on its west side and a larger one on its east side.

Cocktails served at the restaurant included Malayan Mist, Blue Hurricane, Instant Urge, Maiden's Prayer, Misty Isle, Jungle Fever, Head Hunter, Zombie, and the Smoking Eruption. The restaurant was best-known for its "Mystery Drink", a cocktail served in a bowl with a "smoking volcano" in its center. The Mystery Drink served four people and had eight ounces of rum and brandy. It was always served by the "Mystery Girl", a server summoned with a gong, and who only appeared to dance the drink to diners' tables. Fresh orchid leis were presented to the parties; the leis were flown in from Hawaii 2-3 times per week.

Notable restaurant guests included Zsa Zsa Gabor, Bob Hope, Gypsy Rose Lee, Milton Berle, Andy Williams, Robert Goulet, and Van Johnson.

=== Architecture and design ===
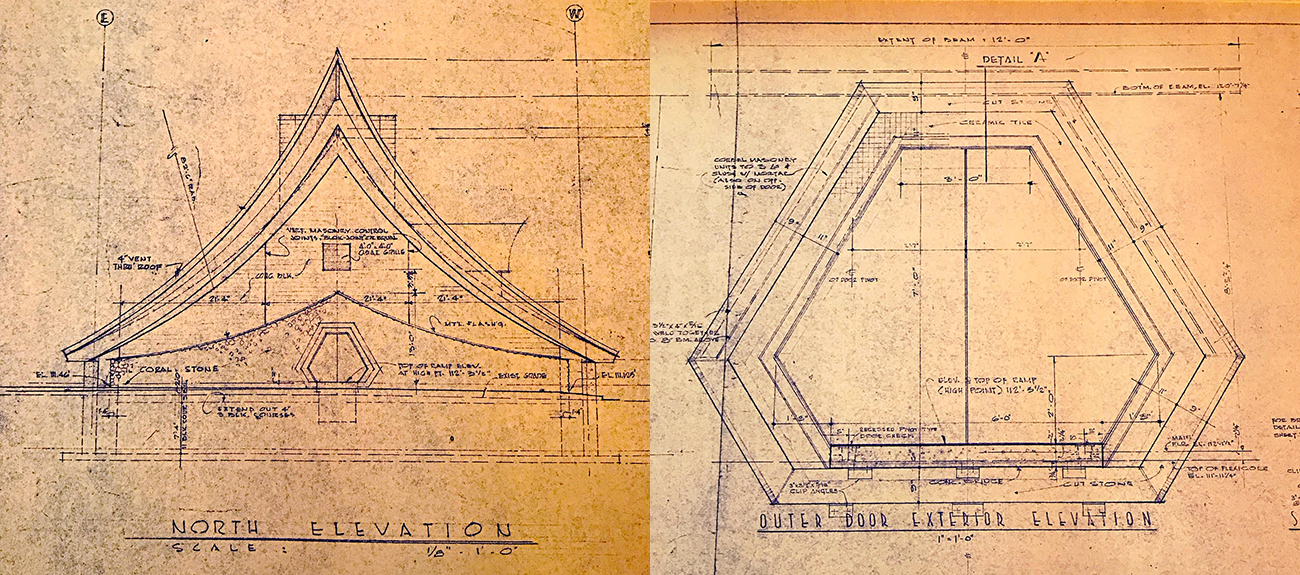
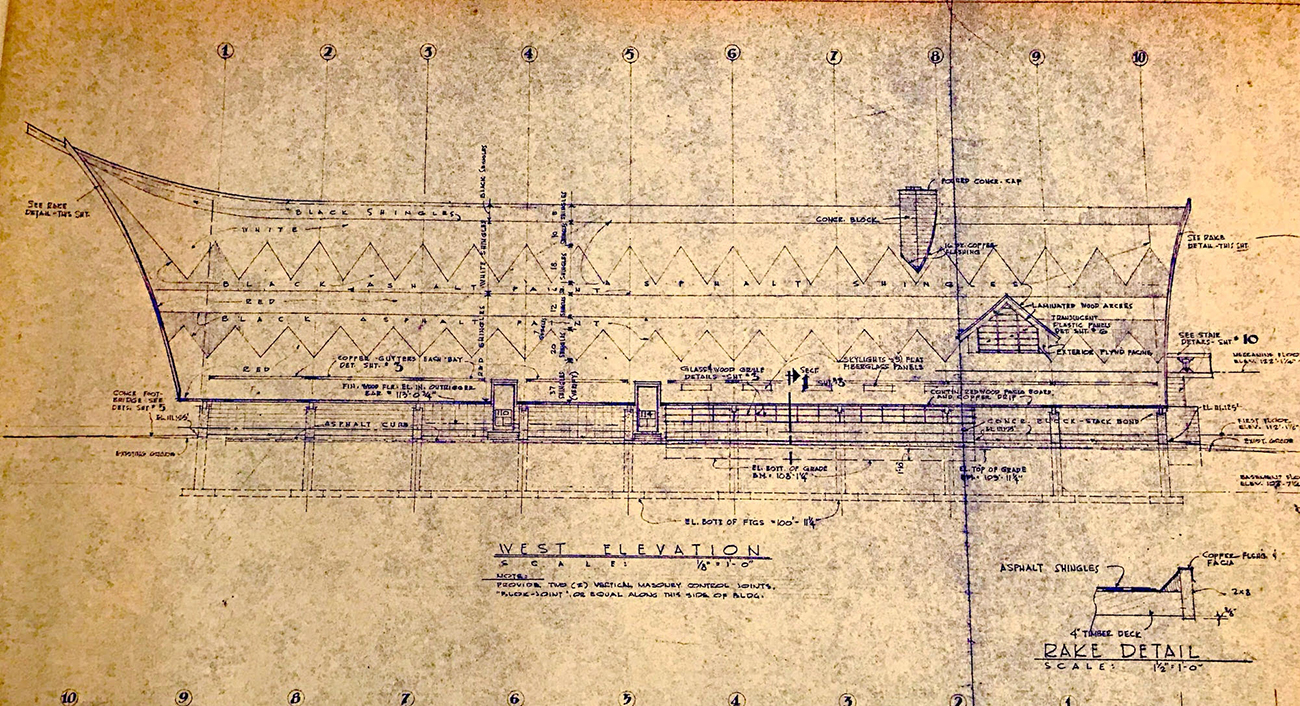
Building plans from 1960

The Kahiki was initially designed by Bernard C. Altenbach. Altenbach had the idea of styling the restaurant like a Polynesian or New Guinea meetinghouse, and designed the interior rooms. Coburn Morgan was hired as the decorator. When Altenbach became too busy, Design Associates of Columbus was hired, principally Ralph Sounik and Ned Eller. It cost $1 million to build. The main building, an immense A-frame building, had a large roof resembling a ship or war canoe, gently sloping on either side. The roof tiles were arranged in a pattern of red, white, and black tiles. The roofline was decorated with abstract fish designs and a pelican. The triangular entryway had colorful vertical painted panels, while the rear facade was unadorned.

The restaurant's entranceway was flanked by two large Moai statues with flaming heads. Between them, a small bridge spanned the moat around the front of the building. The interior spaces had mock rainforests, aquariums, thatch huts, fountains, gongs, drums, and a massive stone Moai fireplace.

== History ==
The Kahiki restaurant was established at the height of popularity for tiki culture in the United States. Its owners, Bill Sapp and Lee Henry, had operated a bar nearby, the Grass Shack. The Polynesian-themed bar was frequented by World War II veterans in the 1950s. It was destroyed in a fire, prompting creation of the Kahiki Supper Club.

In 1957, Sapp and Henry began researching for the restaurant project, including traveling with their designer Coburn Morgan throughout the South Pacific. They gathered artifacts and ideas, and visited tiki restaurants throughout the U.S. The Kahiki restaurant was built from July 1960 to early 1961. It opened its doors in February 1961. In 1975, designer Coburn Morgan drew up plans for an expansion to the restaurant, including a treehouse dining space and museum. Around this time, plans were also drawn for a smaller tiki restaurant that could be replicated for a Kahiki franchise.

Also in 1975, a conflict took place at the restaurant, called the Kahiki Incident. A dispute over a group's bill led to a physical altercation and the arrest of three diners. Two officers were fired for misconduct, though soon rehired. The incident and its fallout in the community was noted as a prominent incident of racial strife in the city.

Sapp and Henry sold the restaurant to Mitch Boich in 1978, who entered a partnership with Michael Tsao later that year. Sapp and Henry made the sale in order to finance a new restaurant, and was sorry to see its sale within two weeks. Tsao bought out his partner in 1988. The business was incorporated in 1993, and the manufacture of prepared foods began in 1995. The company built a small food processing plant to the rear of the restaurant that year to produce its frozen meals.

In 1997, the restaurant was listed on the National Register of Historic Places. At the time, it was the only tiki restaurant in Ohio, and the only remaining supper club in Columbus. It closed on August 26, 2000 due to prohibitively high maintenance costs and a significant loss of business, and so the property was sold to Walgreens. The retail pharmacy tore down the restaurant that year and replaced it with one of its stores. The demolition crew salvaged pieces of the restaurant, including the large fireplace, which required opening up part of the roof. The restaurant's 110 employed staff were allowed to continue work at the business's food manufacturing plant beside the restaurant. The plant moved to a space in Gahanna beside John Glenn International Airport later that year.

Owner Michael Tsao had believed that Columbus would relocate the Kahiki to the riverfront of the Scioto River in Downtown Columbus. He drew up plans for the site, in front of the Franklin County Veterans Memorial, and also considered spaces in Polaris, Easton, and the Arena District. Tsao became caught up with the Kahiki brand's food production, and unexpectedly died in 2005.

== Legacy ==
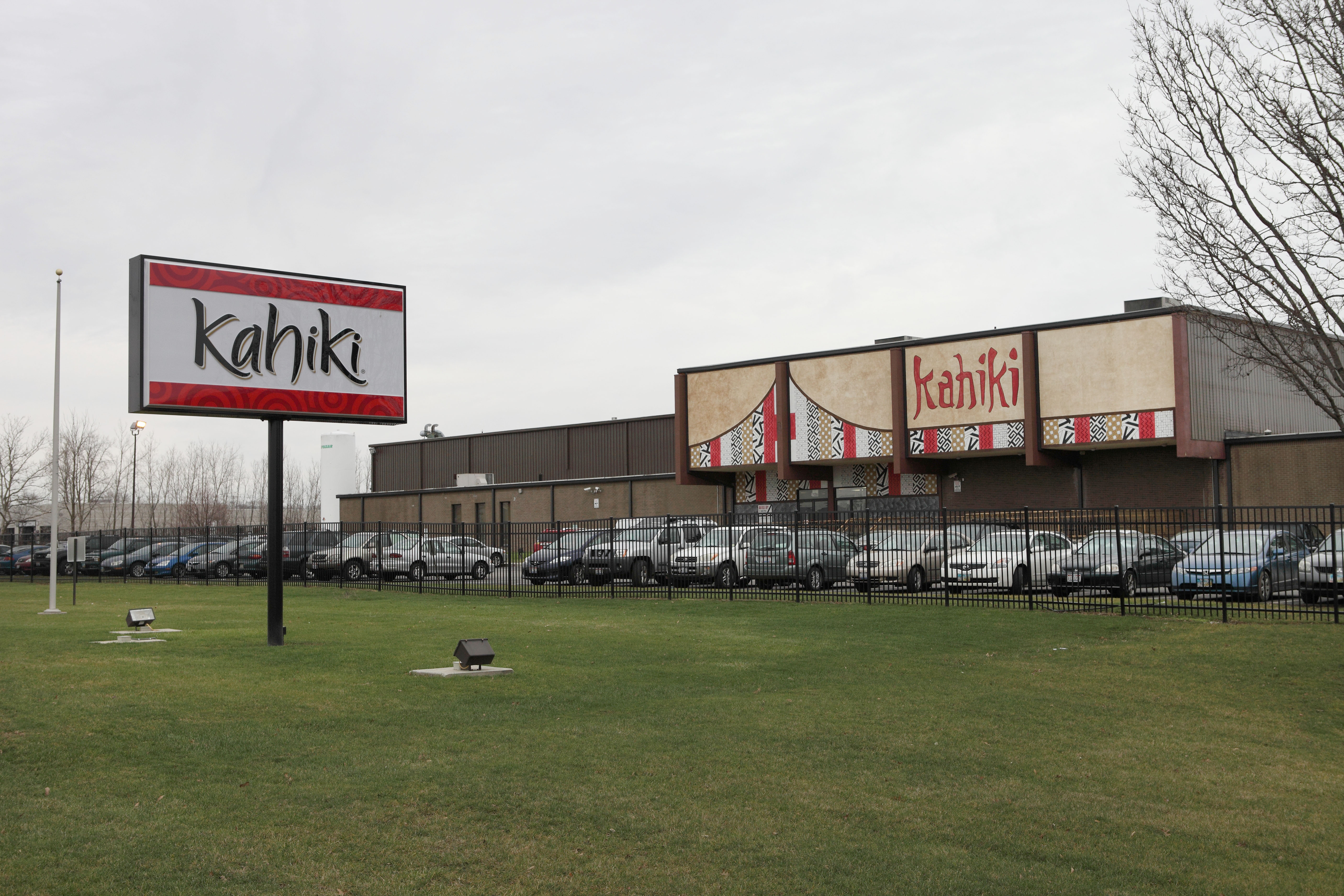
Kahiki Foods in Gahanna

The Fraternal Order of Moai was founded in 2005 to preserve the history and artifacts of the restaurant. It acts as a social club with ten chapters nationwide. Memorials to the Kahiki also exist throughout dozens of websites, discussion boards, and online photo albums. Books and poetry have been written about the restaurant as well. Members of the organization as well as other enthusiasts have gathered tiki items and Kahiki decor to create their own intricately decorated basement tiki bars. These include Shipwreck Shirley's and Rancho Kahiki, private spaces operating out of suburban houses in Columbus.

From 2006 to 2008, former Kahiki employees operated a restaurant named Tropical Bistro. From 2012 to 2019, the Grass Skirt Tiki Room operated in downtown Columbus; the bar featured "George the Monkey", a decorative fountain that stood inside the Kahiki restaurant until the piece was sold at auction to the Fraternal Order of Moai.

Kahiki Foods, originally a side business to the Kahiki Supper Club, manufactures frozen meals for distribution nationwide. The company is headquartered in Gahanna, a suburb of Columbus. The company was bought out by a larger company based in Pittsburgh in 2007, though its Gahanna factory remains in use.

Jeff Tsao (son of final Kahiki owner Michael Tsao) owns Fukuryu Ramen, a small restaurant chain in Central Ohio. The chain's third location, opening in 2022, will feature the Kahiki's Mai Tai recipe.

== Gallery ==
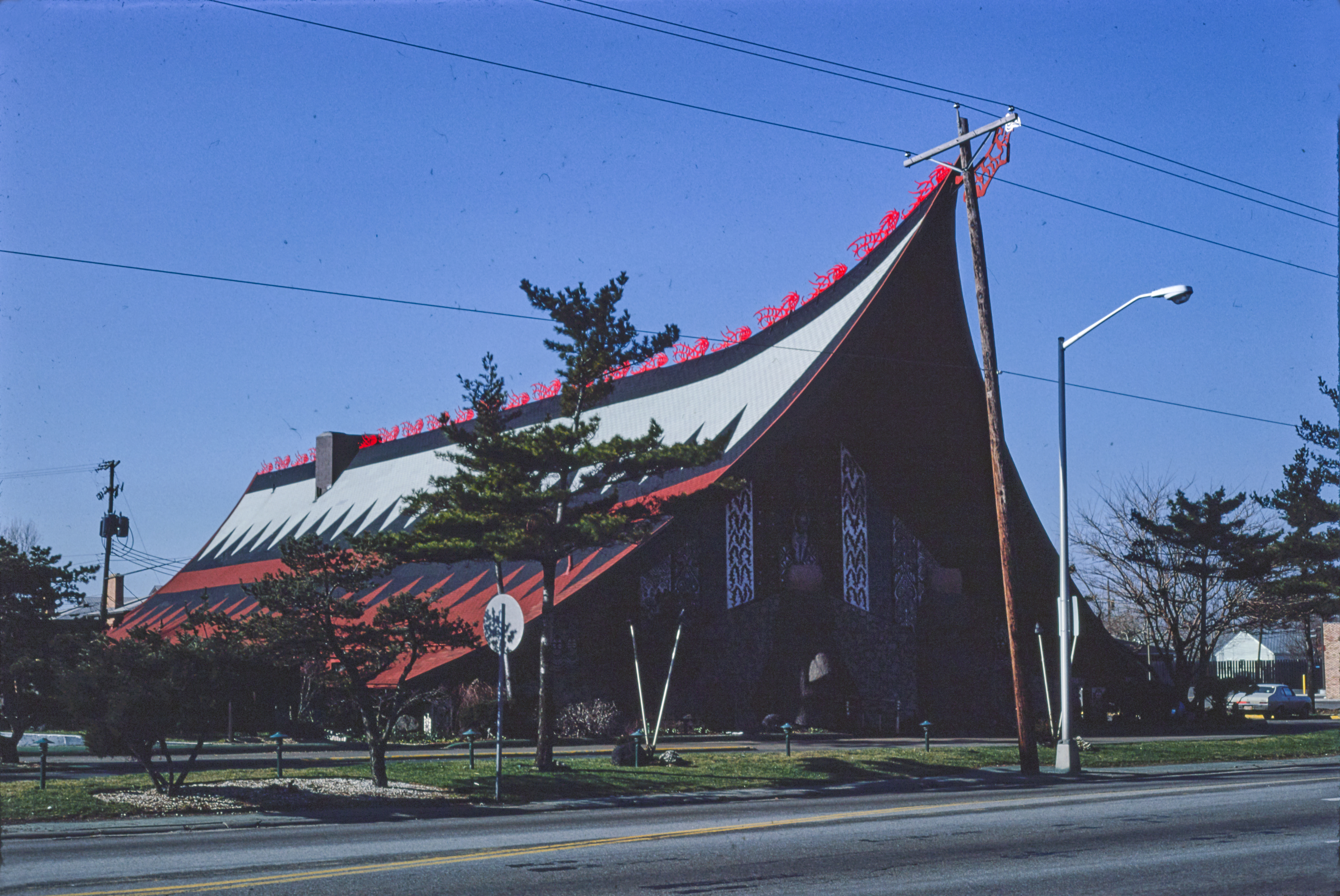
Exterior in 1980

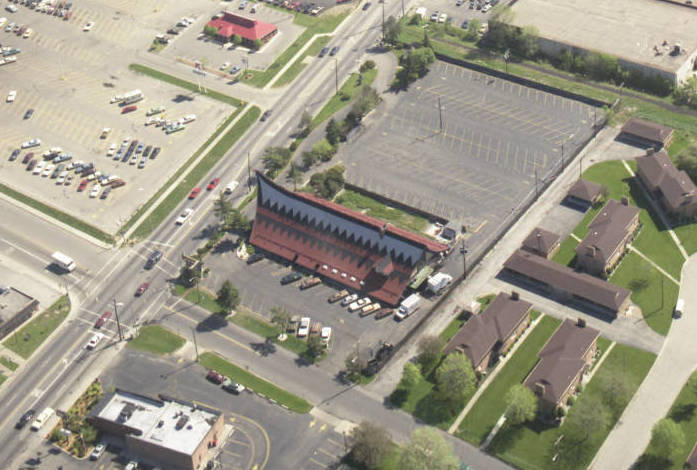
Aerial view c. 1986

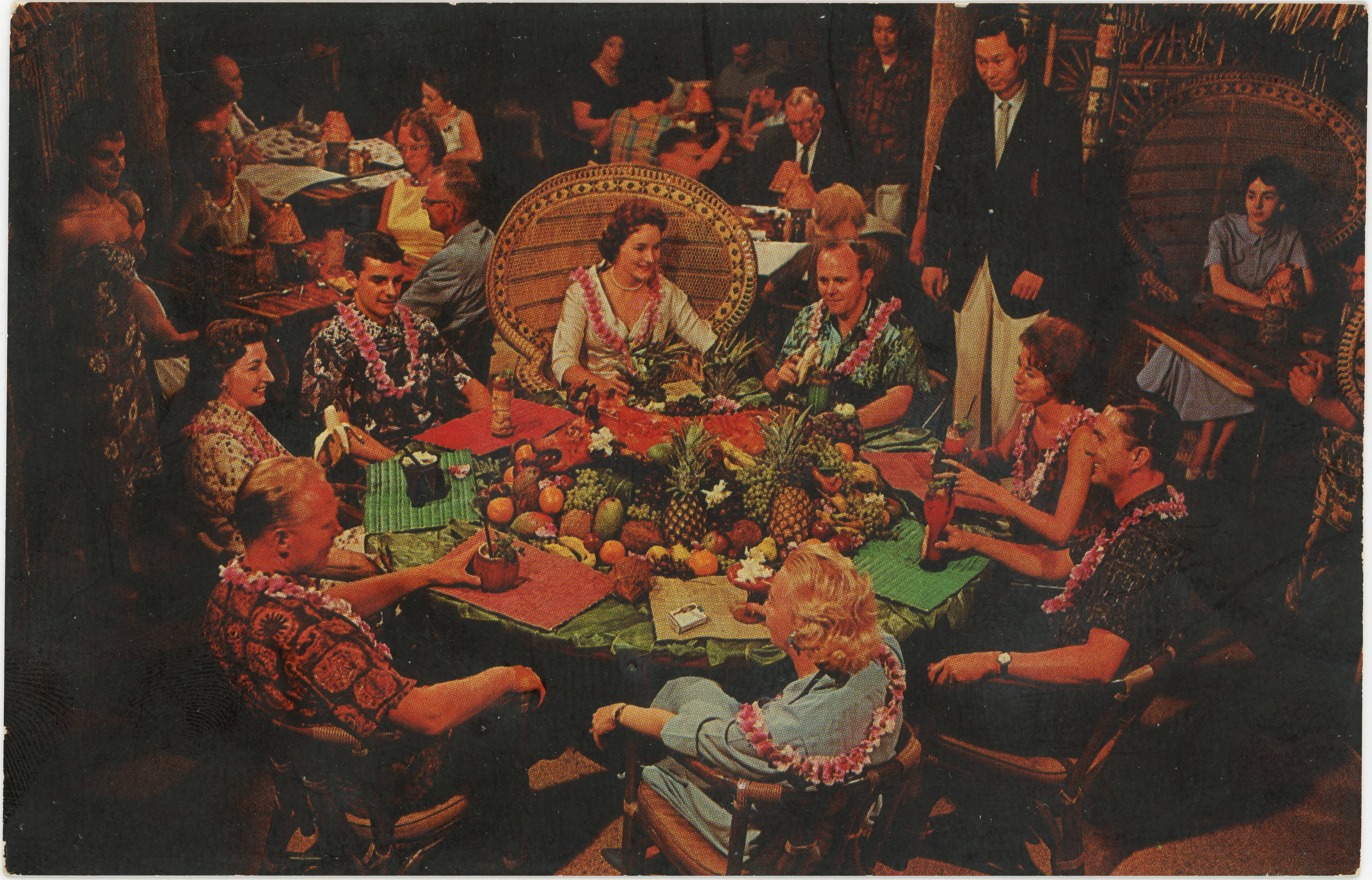
Postcard depicting table service

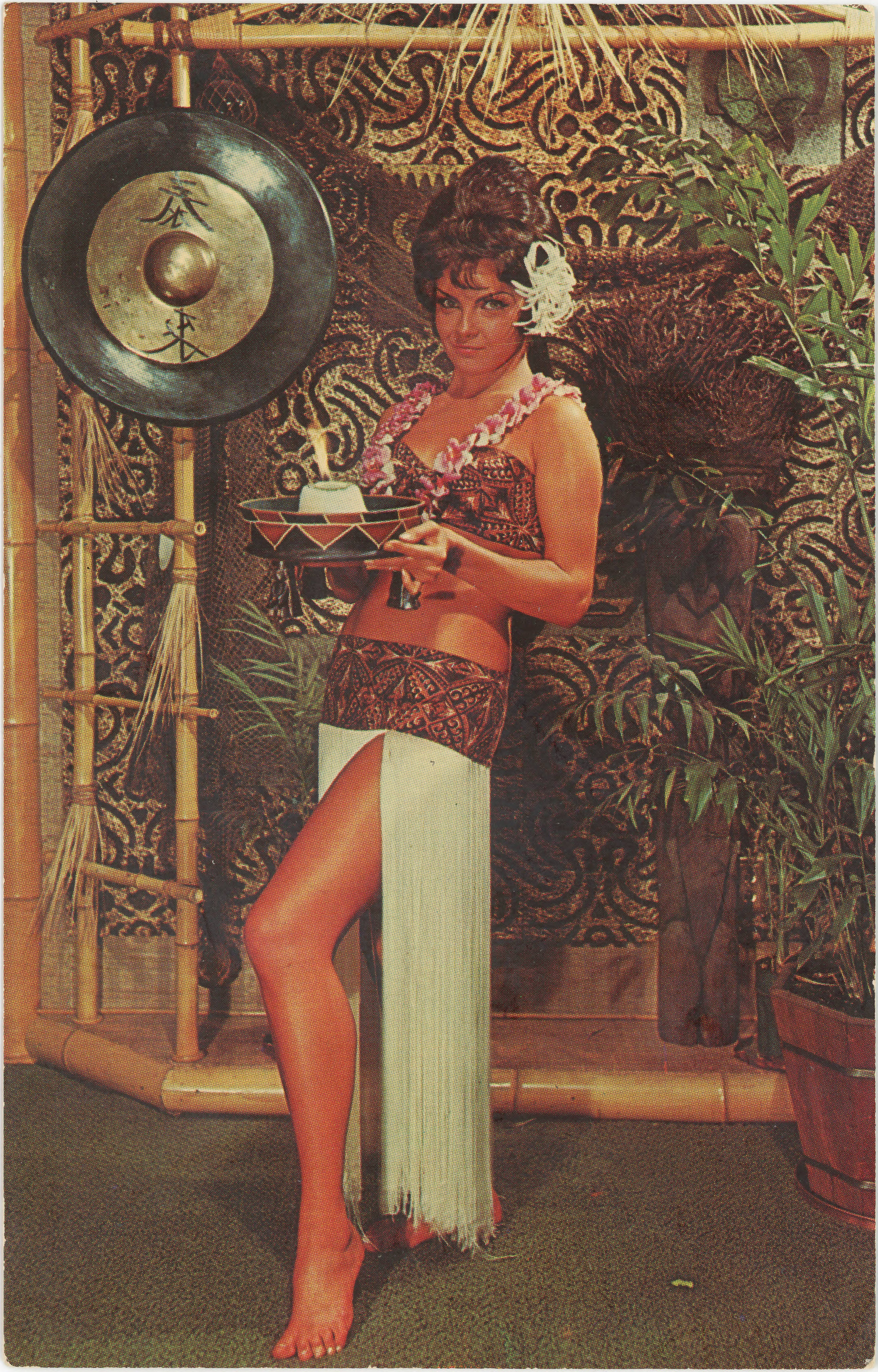
The Kahiki Mystery Girl

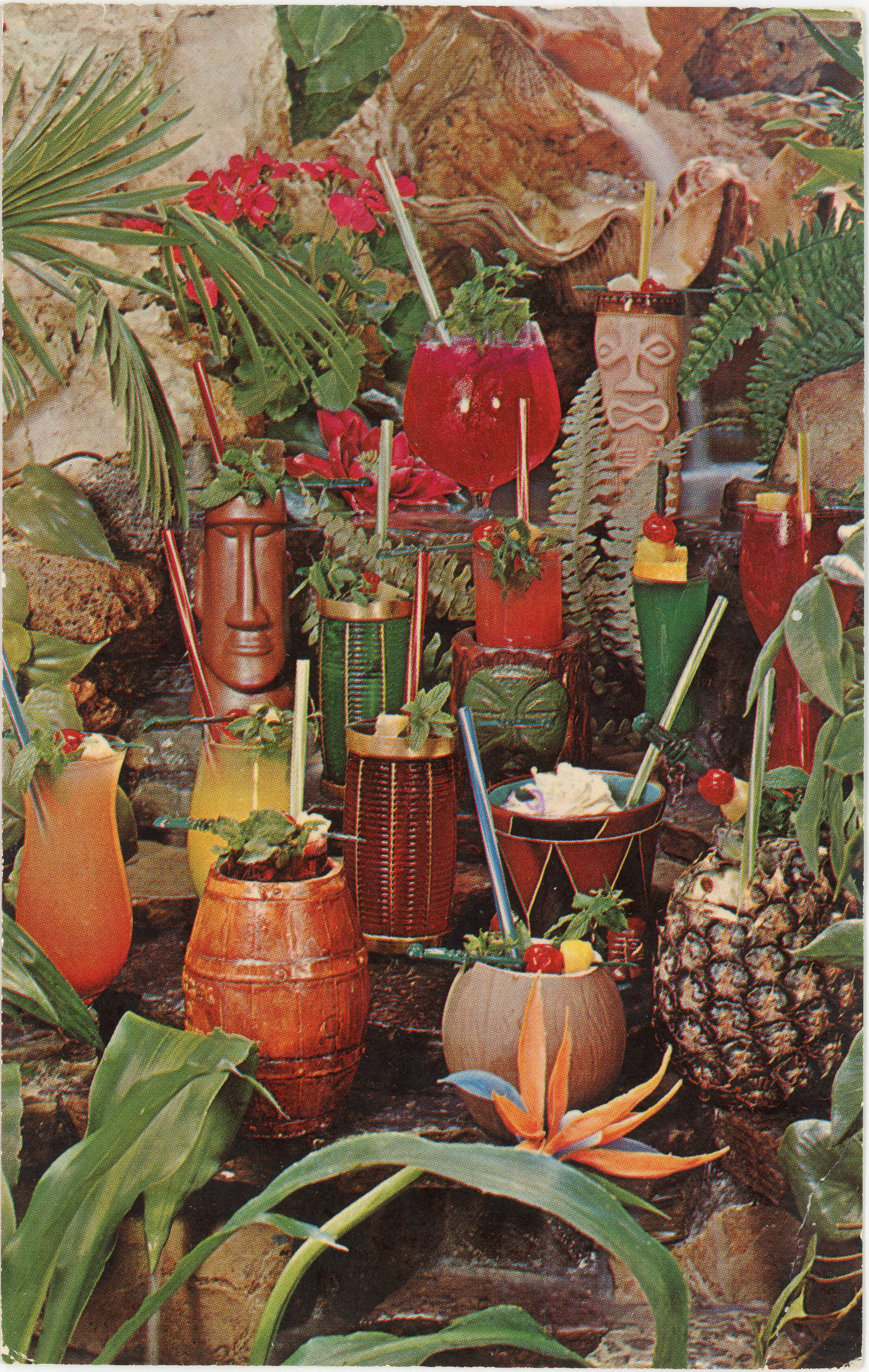
Tiki drinks served at the restaurant

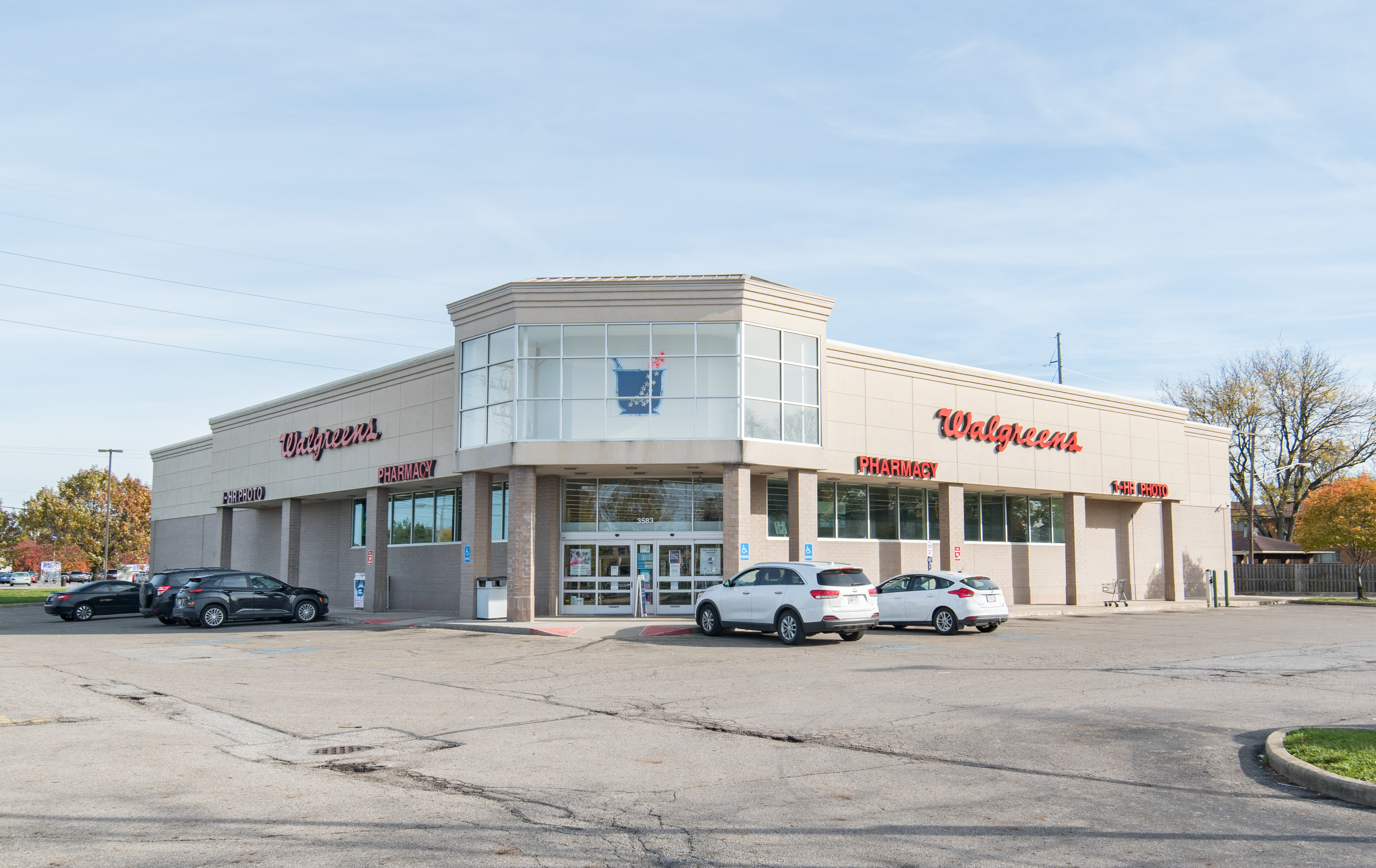
Site of the restaurant in 2021

== See also ==
- List of defunct restaurants of the United States
- Mai-Kai Restaurant
- National Register of Historic Places listings in Columbus, Ohio
