= Shaheed Bhagat Singh College =

College of the University of Delhi

- Motto: Rashtra Devo Bhava
- Type: Public
- Established: 1967; 59 years ago
- Accreditation: NAAC (A Grade)
- Affiliations: University of Delhi
- Principal: Prof. Arun Kumar Attree
- Location: Delhi, India; 28.5285°N 77.2167°E
- Campus: Suburban
- Website: www.sbs.du.ac.in

Shaheed Bhagat Singh College (SBSC), named after Bhagat Singh, was established as a co-educational institute in 1967 as one of the constituent colleges of the University of Delhi. It acquired postgraduate status in a record time of seven years.

== Principals ==
1. M.P. Thakore, 27 Sep 1967 – 27 Jul 1982
2. Parkash Chander, 28 Jul 1982 – 16 Sep 1982
3. N.A. Siddiqui, 17 Sep 1982 – 11 Dec 2000
4. R.R. Chaudhary, 12 Dec 2000 – 03 May 2001
5. S.N. Pandey, 04 May 2001 – 26 Jun 2001
6. Jitender Kaur, 27 Jun 2001 – 11 Dec 2007
7. P.K. Khurana, 12 Dec 2007 – 24 Aug 2009
8. B.C. Sehgal, 25 Aug 2009 – 31 Jul 2011
9. G.K. Kapoor, 01 Aug 2011 – 30 Apr 2012
10. P.K. Khurana, 01 May 2012 – 03 Jul 2015
11. P.K. Khurana, 03 Jul 2015 – 01 Mar 2019
12. Anil Sardana, 02 Mar 2019 – 25 Nov 2022
13. Arun Kumar Attree, 26 Nov 2022 – Present

== Campus ==
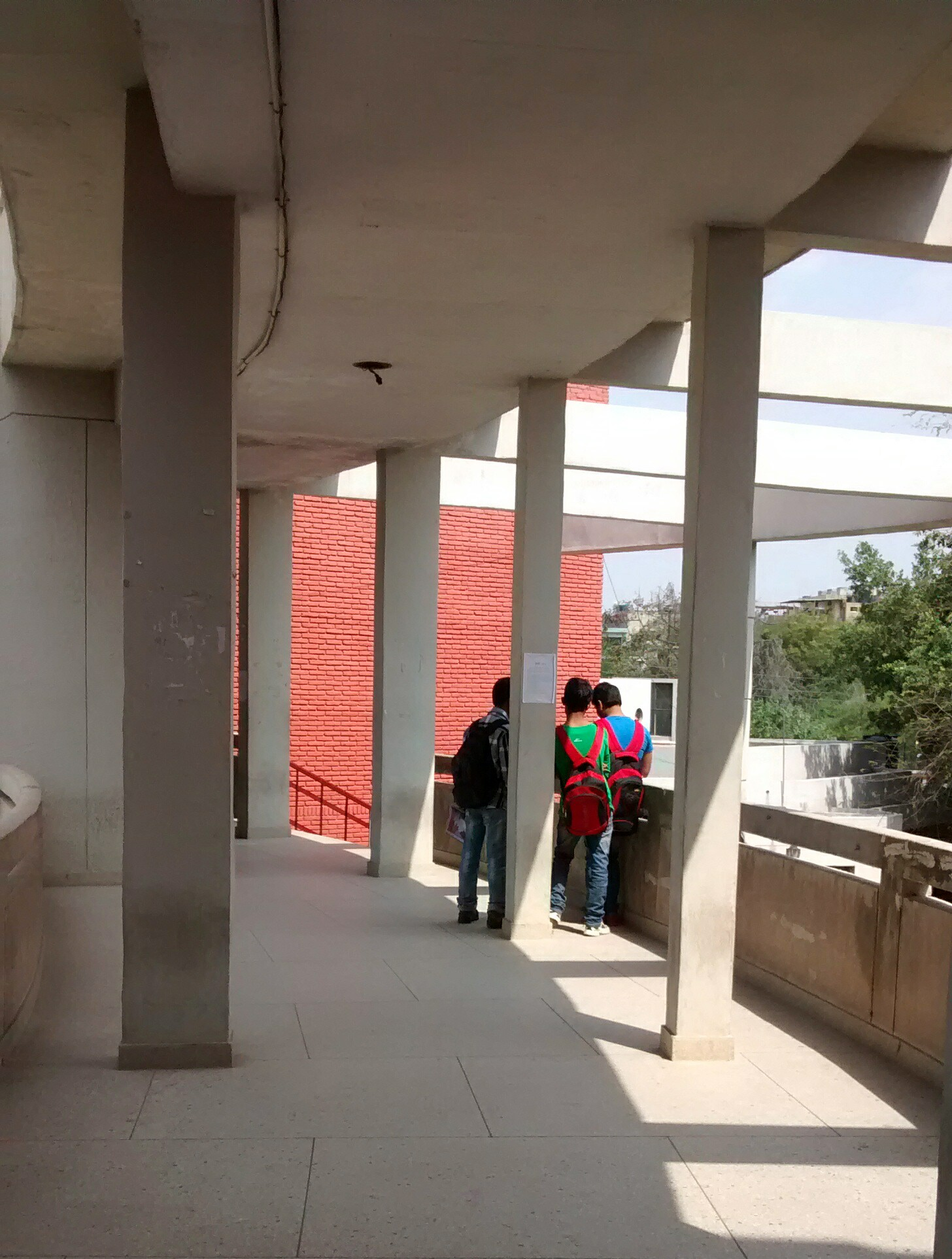
Shaheed Bhagat Singh College Campus

SBSC is part of South Campus and is located in Sheikh Sarai Phase II. The campus features a computerised library, computer lab, geography lab, and mathematics lab. Sports facilities include cricket, hockey, football, volleyball, basketball, lawn tennis, table tennis, badminton, kho-kho, athletics, gymnastics, carrom, and chess.

== Governance ==
The college is headed by Principal Prof. Arun Kumar Attree.

== Academics ==
SBSC is accredited by the National Assessment and Accreditation Council (NAAC) with an 'A' Grade.

=== Academic programmes ===
At the undergraduate level, the college offers three-year degree programs:

- Bachelor’s degree in Commerce, Economics & Mathematics, Economics & Commerce, English & History, Geography & Political Science, Hindi & Geography, and History & Political Science.
- Honours degree in English, Economics, Hindi, History, Geography, Mathematics, Political Science, and Commerce.

At the postgraduate level, SBSC offers a Master of Commerce degree.

=== Rankings ===
- NIRF 2025: Ranked 39
- India Today 2025: Ranked 15

University Express ranked the morning batch of the Commerce undergraduate department 5th among all Delhi University colleges, giving the faculty a 10/10 score.

=== Grants and scholarships ===
The college provides grants and scholarships to deserving students.

== Notable alumni ==
- Bhuvan Bam, actor and internet personality
- Rakesh Bedi, actor
- Ramesh Bidhuri, politician
- Aakash Gupta, comedian
- Aman Gupta, entrepreneur
- Bikky Khosla, entrepreneur
- Sidharth Malhotra, actor
- Harshvardhan Rane, actor
- Shoojit Sircar, film director
