= Surfrider Foundation =

Non-profit environmental organization

- Founded: 1984 (42 years ago)
- Founder: Glenn Hening, Chris Blakely , Lance Carson, and Tom Pratt
- Type: Social welfare organization
- Tax ID no.: 95-3941826
- Legal status: 501(c)(3) charitable organization
- Purpose: The Surfrider Foundation is dedicated to the protection and enjoyment of the world's ocean, waves, and beaches, for all people, through a powerful activist network
- Headquarters: 942 Calle Negocio, Suite 350
- Location: San Clemente, California, United States
- Region served: International
- Methods: local activist network, litigation, research
- Key people: Chad Nelsen, CEO
- Revenue: $12,434,931 (2022)
- Expenses: $11,651,732 (2022)
- Employees: 78 (2025)
- Volunteers: ~100,000 (2022)
- Website: surfrider.org

The Surfrider Foundation is a U.S. 501(c)(3) non-profit environmental organization that lobbies for the protection of oceans and beaches.

== History ==
The Surfrider Foundation was started in Malibu, California, in 1984 by a handful of surfers to protest threats to their local surf break at Malibu Point. The organization continued on for several years as a loose advocacy group until 1991, when the first chapters were founded. Rob Caughlan served as president from 1984 to 1991.

In their 2025 report on the previous year, it was estimated that the Surfrider Foundation collected 365,000 pounds (166,000 kg) of trash with 40,000 volunteers. Of the waste collected, 83% were plastics and 32.5% were plastic fragments. The most numerous items collected were cigarette butts.

=== Activism ===
The foundation was a key plaintiff in the battle to open Martin's Beach in San Mateo County, California. The case resolved in 2018, when the United States Supreme Court rejected Vinod Khosla's appeal.

Starting in 2005, The Surfrider Foundation was one of several environmental organizations that led efforts to prevent a 6-lane toll road that would have cut through San Onofre State Beach, the Donna O'Neil Land Conservancy, sacred sites of the Acjachemen and endanger San Mateo Creek Watershed. On September 25, 2020, California governor Gavin Newsom signed AB1426 prohibiting the development of any roadway(s) that might impact or encroach upon the state beach, ending the decades long battle.

==== Advocacy against housing and rail ====
In 2024, Surfrider opposed legislation that would reduce the ability of the California Coastal Commission to block housing in already urbanized parts of the coastal zone.

In 2024, Surfrider called for the closure of the Pacific Surfliner rail that runs adjacent to the San Clemente shoreline. Surfrider said that the rail service had an adverse environmental impact and should be subjected to a full environmental impact study.
