= Mount St Mary's School (New Delhi) =

Coordinates: 28.5830°N 77.1359°E

Mount St. Mary's School
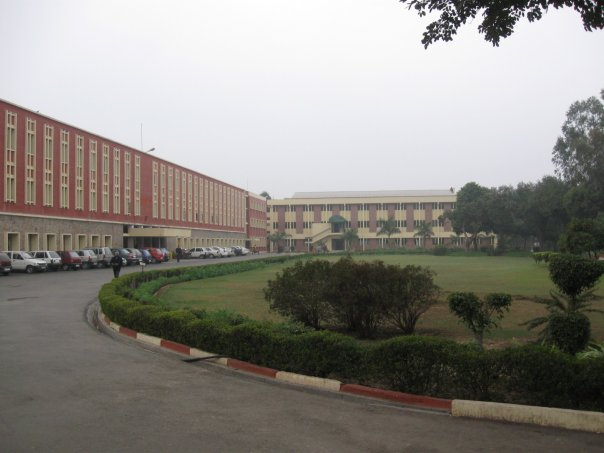

Location
- Parade Road, Delhi cantt New Delhi, Delhi; India

Information
- School type: Public
- Motto: "Pro Deo Et Patria ("For God And Country)"
- Established: 1963; 63 years ago
- Founder: Rev. Bro. E.T. Dunne
- Principal: Bro. Tomy Varghese
- Faculty: Fulltime
- Website: www.msmschool.in

Mount St. Mary's School is a Patrician Brothers' School run by the Brothers of St Patrick. It is located in Delhi Cantt, Delhi, India, at 75, Parade Road. The school was established in 1963. The current principal is Bro. Joseph. O.J

== History ==
In 1963, the Brothers of St Patrick opened the school in Delhi at the invitation of the Army. It started with four Brothers, six teachers and 85 students. The first Principal was Bro. E.T Dunne who was in charge of the school till January 1969. The foundation stone was laid on 6 January 1963, by Lt Gen Bhagwati Singh, who was at that time G.O.C of Delhi Area, New Delhi.

The school was first housed in eight tents (with seven classes)- there were only two students in the seventh standard. The building work started immediately, and the entire school moved into the building in July 1963. Two floors were completed in December 1963. This building was however not complete as the number of students were increasing and a Science Block was required. The staff and students organised fetes in 1966 and 1968, which brought in enough money to help complete the building.

== Facilities ==
In addition to two computer labs, two libraries, and three science labs, the school also has sports fields and courts - onesynthetic tennis courts, one soccer fields, a cricket ground, volleyball court, one outdoor badminton courts and onesynthetic basketball court. In addition to these, there is a science park, skating rink, swimming pool and centrally air-conditioned auditorium with a capacity of nearly one thousand people.

== Syllabus ==
All students are given an education based on the requirements of the Central Board of Secondary Education (CBSE). Religious instruction is imparted to Catholic pupils.

== Notable alumni ==
- Arnab Goswami former editor-in-chief, Times Now news channel
- Gaurav Kapur TV and radio host and actor
- Hitesh Madan founder and lead guitarist of music band Eka and Euphoria (past)
- Jaspreet Jasz singer
- Krishnakumar Kunnath playback singer
- Shaleen Malhotra actor
- Vinod Khosla co-founder of Sun Microsystems, venture capitalist - Khosla Ventures
- Aru Krishansh Verma film actor
