= Martins Beach =

Beach in San Mateo County, California

- Beach
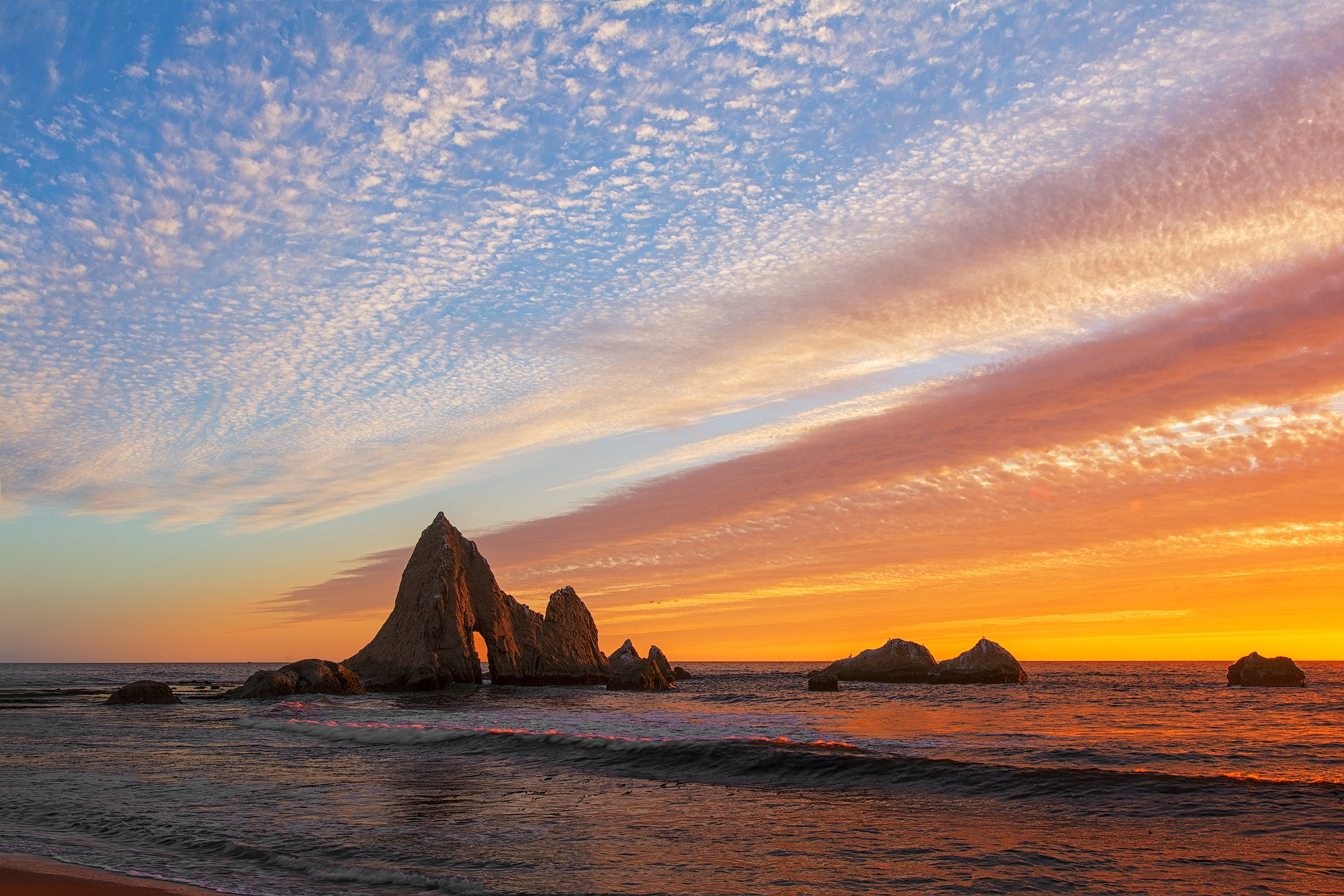
- Pelican Rock at Martins Beach

- Coordinates: 37°22′31″N 122°24′31″W
- Location: San Mateo County, California, US
- Elevation: 0 m

Martins Beach is a beach located in San Mateo County, California, named after local landowner and farmer Nicholas Martin. The beach is accessible only via Martins Beach Road, which runs from Highway 1 through privately held land. Billionaire Vinod Khosla, the current owner of the land, has sought to establish that he has the right to refuse access to the public.

== Background ==
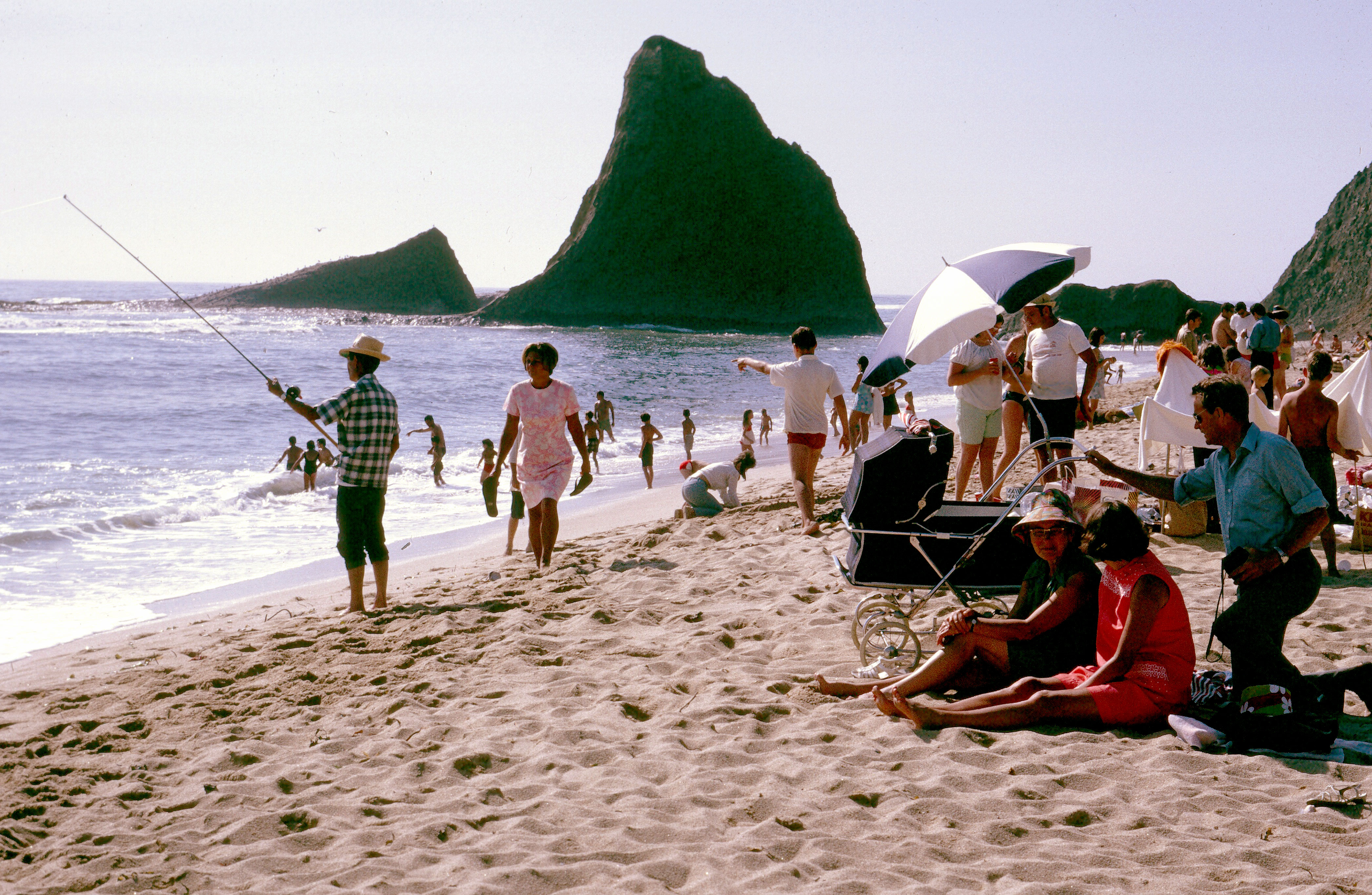
Martin's Beach, c. 1970

Martins Beach is made up of two shallow coves surrounded by sheer and overhanging cliffs. The coves are divided by "Pelican Rock", a tall and sharply pointed rock cone surrounded by a narrow spit of tidepools.

Once part of the Rancho Cañada de Verde y Arroyo de la Purisima, the beach and the land around it were purchased in the 1850s by Nicholas Martin. Martins Beach has historically been a popular family beach and surf spot. As of 2014, there were 45 leased beach cabins.

Since the early 1900s, the Deeney family, the land owners, allowed the public free access to the beach, but charged to park vehicles. In the early 1920s, the Deeneys leased the beach to the Watts family. They managed the beach and visitor amenities, including Watts Inn on the beach, which still stands. Also included was paid parking by the highway. In the early 1990s, the Deeneys took over management of the beach. They allowed use of the beach in exchange for a parking fee.

== Legal conflict over access ==
In 2008, Vinod Khosla purchased the property adjacent to the beach, gated the single road running through it to the beach, and after 2010, prevented public access despite a San Mateo County judge's ruling that he must open the gate. Since then, there has been an ongoing legal battle to reopen the beach to the public under the legal theory of implied dedication and the California Coastal Act.

Khosla cites the Fifth Amendment ban on taking of private property without "just compensation". The first lawsuit was brought in 2014 by the Surfrider Foundation.

In 2016, Khosla offered to sell a small slice of the property for a public beach path for $30 million, about as much as he spent on the entire property in 2008.

A court subsequently ruled that Khosla may not close the gate without obtaining a permit from the California Coastal Commission. The Supreme Court declined to hear his appeal, but in 2019 an appeals court ruled that the former owners' permitting access had not established a right of public access.

In 2020, the Coastal Commission and the California State Lands Commission brought a new lawsuit against Khosla; a trial is scheduled to begin in 2025.
