= Vinod Khosla =

Indian-American businessman (born 1955)

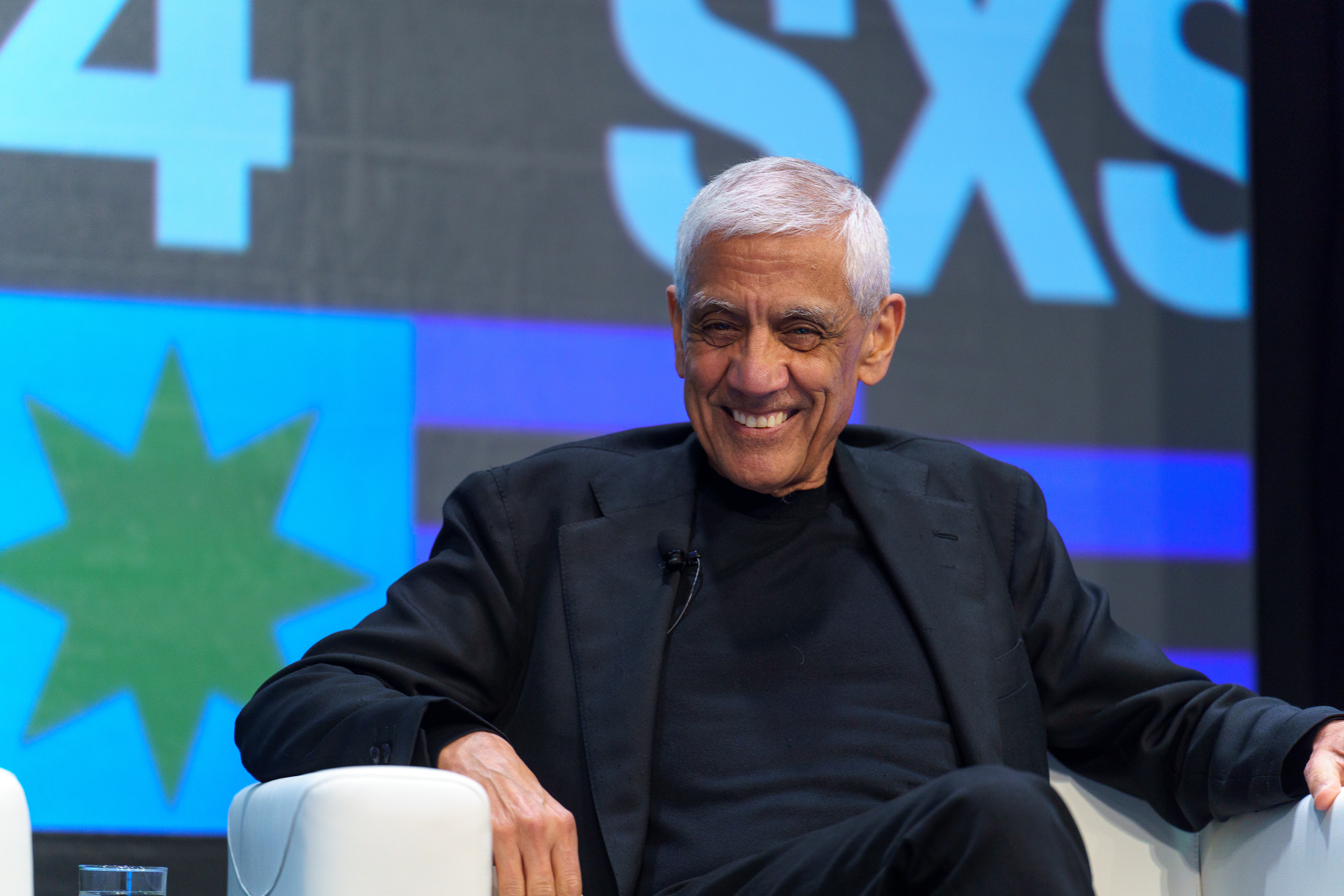
- Khosla at the 2024 South by Southwest in Austin, Texas
- Born: 28 January 1955 (age 71); Pune, Bombay State, India
- Education: Mount St Mary's School
- Alma mater: IIT Delhi (BE); Carnegie Mellon University (MS); Stanford University (MBA)
- Known for: Co-founder of Sun Microsystems, Chairman of the Seattle Seahawks, founder of Khosla Ventures
- Spouse: Neeru Khosla
- Children: 4
- Relatives: Bikky Khosla (brother)

Vinod Khosla (born 28 January 1955) is an Indian-American billionaire, entrepreneur, and venture capitalist. He is a co-founder of Sun Microsystems and the founder of Khosla Ventures, as well as the owner of the Seattle Seahawks. Khosla made his wealth from early venture capital investments in areas including networking, software, and alternative energy technologies. He has been described by The Information as one of the most successful and influential venture capitalists.

He was an early signatory to the Giving Pledge. In 2026, Khosla was ranked No. 13 on Forbes' 250 list of America's Greatest Living Optimists and No. 10 in the Forbes 250 list of America's Greatest Innovators. Also in 2026, he was ranked 14th on Forbes' inaugural "250: America's Most Successful Living Immigrants" list. In June 2024, Khosla was featured on the cover of Forbes as part of the magazine's "The Epic Battle for AI's Future" issue, alongside fellow venture capitalists Marc Andreessen and Reid Hoffman. In September 2024, he was named to Time's TIME100 AI list of the 100 most influential people in artificial intelligence and was featured on the issue's cover. Khosla was No. 1 on the 2026 Forbes Midas List and on the inaugural list in 2001. In 2001, Red Herring called him "The No. 1 VC on the Planet", noting Khosla created six jobs every day from 1976 to 2001.

As of May 2026, Forbes estimates his net worth at $15.6 billion.

== Early life and education ==
Khosla was born on 28 January 1955 in Pune, in the Bombay State (now Maharashtra) of India, into a Punjabi Hindu family. His father was an officer in the Indian Army, posted to New Delhi. His father wanted him to also join the army.

Khosla attended Mount St Mary's School in New Delhi for elementary school. He became interested in entrepreneurship after reading about the founding of Intel in Electronic Engineering Times as a teenager, which led him to pursue technology as a career and begin a business. According to Khosla, he was inspired by Intel co-founder Andrew Grove, a Hungarian immigrant who acquired funding for Intel in Silicon Valley, when it was a startup.

From 1971 to 1976, Vinod Khosla attended Indian Institute of Technology, Delhi, where he earned a bachelor's degree in electrical engineering. While at IIT Delhi, Khosla started a computer club focused on programming. He later recalled that when the institute's IT staff went on strike, the club was given access to the computer center. As a student, Khosla wrote a paper on parallel processing before the technology became mainstream and helped launch what has been described as India's first biomedical engineering program. Khosla has said that the biomedical engineering work involved collaboration between IIT Delhi and the All India Institute of Medical Sciences. In 1975, Khosla attempted to start a soy milk company intended to provide a milk alternative to Indian consumers without refrigerators to preserve cow milk. However, his business had no funding and on hearing he would have to wait seven years to get a phone line, he decided to try to get to Silicon Valley. In 1976, at age 21, Khosla moved to the United States to attend Carnegie Mellon University in Pittsburgh, where he received a full scholarship to pursue a master's degree in biomedical engineering, graduating in 1978. He applied to the Stanford Business School's MBA program twice and was rejected. However, three weeks after beginning an MBA program at Carnegie Mellon, he was accepted to Stanford's MBA program and received his MBA in 1980.

== Personal life ==
In 1980 he married Neeru Khosla, his girlfriend since he was 16. They have four children and since 1986 they have lived at the same residence. In 2001, Khosla said he makes a point of having dinner with his family at least 25 times a month. On most days he fasts until dinner because he says food slows him down.

== Career ==
After completing his MBA at Stanford in 1980, Vinod Khosla decided to become an entrepreneur. He rejected several employment opportunities to establish his first business venture.

=== Co-founding Sun Microsystems and early investments: 1980–2003 ===
In 1980, the 25-year-old Khosla developed a business plan for an electronic design automation company for electrical engineers. He was introduced to employees at Intel and became the first full-time founder and chief financial officer of Daisy Systems, his first startup, and one of the first companies to go after the computer-aided design software market. The company spent 80 percent of its resources on building custom computer hardware that could run its software. Khosla left the company in order to create a startup that manufactures general purpose computers. Khosla left Daisy Systems before the company's IPO, which was one of the most successful IPOs of 1984. In 1981, Khosla co-founded Data Dump with a former Stanford classmate, Scott McNealy, which ended up failing.

In 1982, Khosla co-founded Sun Microsystems (SUN is the acronym for the Stanford University Network), along with Stanford classmates Andy Bechtolsheim, who was licensing a computer design for $10,000 to local companies, and Scott McNealy, a Harvard-trained economist and Stanford MBA. UC Berkeley computer science graduate student Bill Joy later joined the company as co-founder. Sun Microsystems sold servers to the universities they graduated from and other colleges, desktop computers, and created the Java programming language. Sun pioneered open systems technology and RISC processors, and focused on distributed systems. They sold networked servers and workstations, and created NFS, among the first open-sourced commercial software, virtual memory microprocessor based personal desktops, and the first RISC based SPARC processors. Khosla raised $300,000 in seed capital from venture capital firm Kleiner Perkins Caufield & Byers. The original Sun Microsystems business plan was later used as a Harvard Business School case study. Within five years, Sun made $1 billion in annual sales. Khosla also recruited early executives and developers such as Eric Schmidt, who went on to become CEO of Google, and Carol Bartz, a future CEO of Yahoo!. He served as the first chairman and CEO from 1982 to 1984, when he left the company to become a venture capitalist.

In 1986, Khosla joined the venture capital firm Kleiner Perkins as a general partner, alongside Sun Microsystems board member John Doerr. At Kleiner Perkins, Khosla managed investments in technologies, such as video games and semiconductors. He helped create NexGen, the first successful Intel microprocessor clone company, which was sold to AMD for 28 percent of its market cap. He invested in Go Corporation, which developed a stylus-operated computer and was seen as one of the largest Silicon Valley startup failures. In 1994, he suggested that Excite adapt its search engine for the internet and helped finance the special disk drive the company needed to run their search engine starting with a $5,000 check to test his theory by buying a bigger hard drive. Khosla was also involved in suggesting the advertising model as a source of revenue. During his time at Excite, Khosla convinced Google founders to sell to Excite for $1 million, which Excite CEO George Bell rejected. On April 1, 1996, Khosla informed Excite co-founder Joe Kraus that the search engine company's IPO had been canceled, hours before the stock was to start trading; however, thirty minutes later he called him back to let him know it was an April Fools joke. He mentored the founders until the company was sold to @Home Network for $7 billion in May 1999, which was his first venture capital deal of that size. Afterwards, Khosla was an early proponent of fiber optics and the internet for faster communication and started focusing on telecommunication networking companies. In 2001, Khosla expressed disdain for the recently funded optical networking companies saying that what was happening was “greed” similar to the dot-com space. It was stated that “It was as if he had a cheat code for the broadband future."

Khosla helped incubate Juniper Networks in 1995–1996 with founder Pradeep Sindhu, backing the development of high-speed TCP/IP routers for public networks at a time when major telecommunications companies were pursuing ATM for their network infrastructure. Kleiner Perkins invested approximately $3 million in Juniper Networks, an investment that ultimately generated approximately $7 billion for the firm. The Wall Street Journal later cited the investment as among the most profitable venture investments in U.S. companies in absolute dollar terms. He also incubated Cerent Corporation in 1996. Kleiner Perkins invested approximately $8 million in the company; its stake was valued at approximately $2.4 billion when Cisco acquired Cerent in 1999. In November 1999, John Doerr said Khosla "made Kleiner $10 billion in profits" from a group of fabulously successful fiber-optic and internet investments in the 1990s, including Juniper, Cerent, and Excite.

In 2001, it was said that Khosla had created more multibillion-dollar companies than any other VC, save John Doerr. Doerr, Arthur Rock of Arthur Rock & Company, who invested in Intel and Apple, and Donald Valentine of Sequoia Capital, who invested in Intel, are the only other VCs that match his record.

=== Development of Khosla Ventures: 2004–present ===
In 2004, in order to spend more time with his teenage children and focus on science-based technology startups, Khosla moved to part-time and eventually left Kleiner Perkins. He founded his own venture capital firm, Khosla Ventures, later that year as a way to invest in more experimental technologies with "social impact". The firm has invested across sectors including enterprise software, consumer technology, healthcare, artificial intelligence, robotics, financial technology, defense, infrastructure, energy and materials science. At the time, he had about $1.5 billion from co-founding Sun Microsystems and his work with Kleiner Perkins. The firm is based in Menlo Park, California.

In September 2009, Khosla Ventures raised $750 million in investor commitments for its third fund, Khosla Ventures III, which focused on investments in traditional early-stage and growth-stage companies. Khosla also raised $250 million for Khosla Seed, which would invest in higher-risk opportunities. He opened up Khosla Ventures to outside investors for the first time that same year. The firm became known for being an early investor in Square, DoorDash, and Instacart, investments in alternative energy technology, such as solar, biofuel, and batteries, ethanol, and aviation fuel, and long-horizon investments across fintech, enterprise software, artificial intelligence, healthcare, transportation, and energy. He has advocated for breakthroughs in these "clean" energies rather than efficiency on energy consumption. He has referred to these early investments as "Cleantech 1.0" which includes investments in LanzaTech, QuantumScape, Fortera, Mainspring Energy and others. The firm incubated carbon recycling and aviation fuel company LanzaTech and QuantumScape, a solid state battery company worth $16b on its offering and positioned as the best solid state battery company for EV's. According to Business Insider, Khosla Ventures' investment in QuantumScape returned more than $1 billion after approximately ten years, reflecting the extended timelines associated with several of the firm's science-driven investments. During the same period, Khosla Ventures was also investing in non-climate sectors, including enterprise infrastructure, developer tools, consumer internet, fintech, healthcare, and artificial intelligence. Khosla believes carbon sequestration is an area that needs significant advancements and is the most feasible. Khosla believes that a dozen dramatic technologies are needed to solve climate change, and it is inaccurate to consider cleantech investing as a bust, which he states in his 2020 blog post "A few Critical Climate Technology Breakthroughs Multiplied by "Instigators" is desperately needed". Recent investments in alternative energy and climate technology include fusion company Commonwealth Fusion, renewable nitrogen fertilizer company Nitricity, public transportation company Glydways, green hydrogen company Verdagy, and direct air capture company Spiritus.

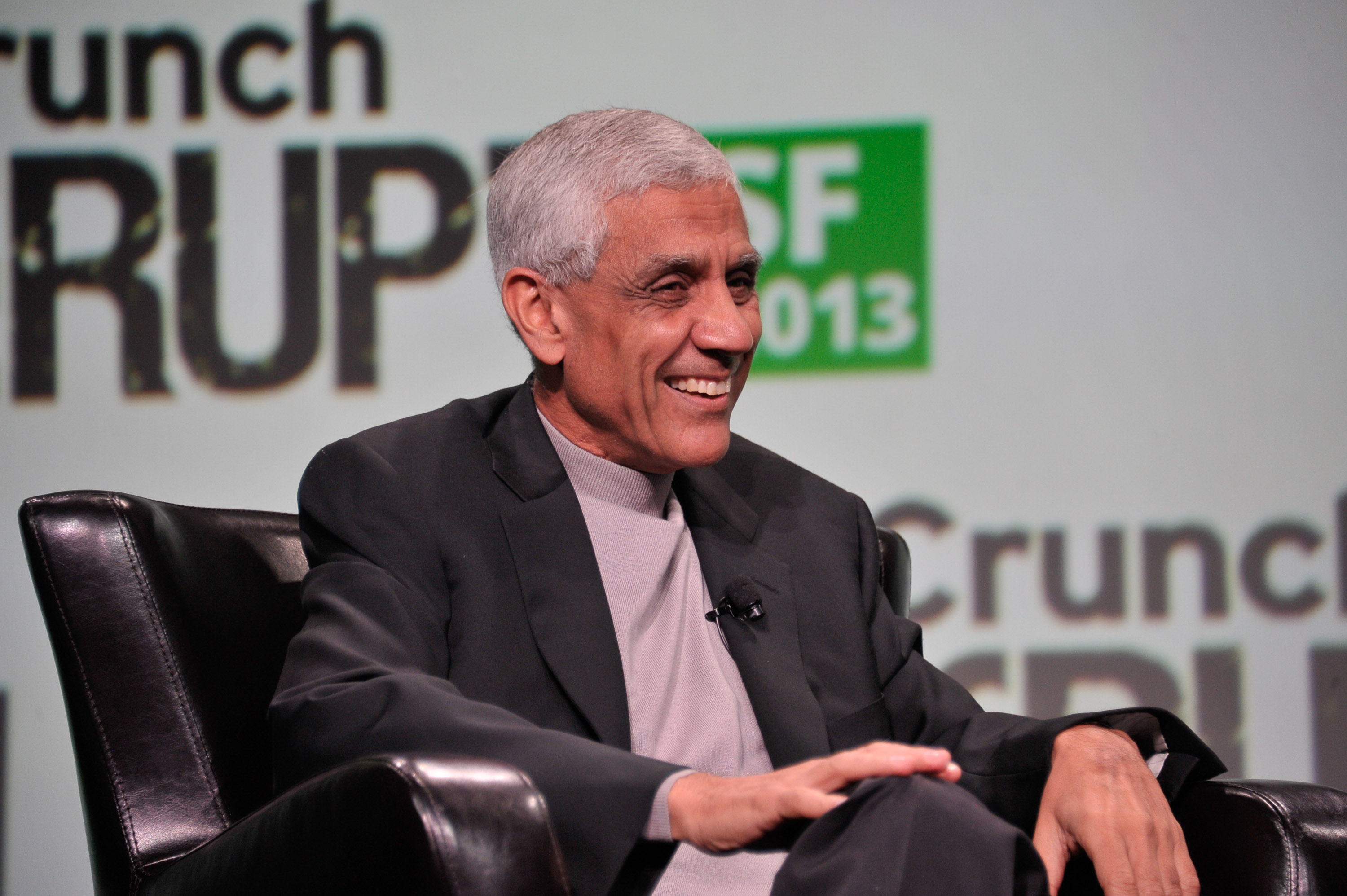
TechCrunch SF 2013 in San Francisco

Beginning in 2010, Khosla Ventures began investing in food and was the first investor in companies like Instacart and DoorDash. Fintech was also an area of focus with early investments in Square, Stripe and Affirm, which all resulted in large returns for Khosla Ventures. In May 2010, it was announced that former British Prime Minister Tony Blair was to join Khosla Ventures to provide strategic advice regarding investments in technologies focused on the environment. During this time, Khosla had hired Condoleezza Rice's advisory firm to work with portfolio companies.

In 2012, Khosla wrote an article titled "Do We Need Doctors Or Algorithms?" arguing the increasing importance of artificial intelligence in medicine claiming "bionic assistance" will eventually replace most doctors. In 2012, he also wrote "Do we need teachers?" which was also on the future of AI in education. He started investing in medicine and robotics, such as companies that use artificial intelligence in medical treatments at that time. In 2016, Khosla wrote a paper "20% Doctor Included" where he predicted AI would eventually transform healthcare. Khosla has argued that artificial intelligence will significantly influence primary care and mental healthcare, predicting that AI-based services could eventually provide near-unlimited access to care at very low cost. He has argued that fee-for-service reimbursement discourages the adoption of AI-delivered care, while capitated payment models give providers a financial incentive to use it.Khosla Ventures is an investor in Curai Health, an artificial intelligence-based primary care company that seeks to use AI to scale physicians' expertise and reduce the cost of primary care.

Beginning around age 60, Khosla said he began considering what he wanted to work on over the following two decades, an exercise that culminated in his 2018 essay "Reinventing Societal Infrastructure with Technology". In the essay, he outlined a long-term focus on using technological innovation to reshape major sectors of the economy, including healthcare, transportation, housing, financial services, energy, and food and agriculture. The Information later described this philosophy as an effort to identify categories of nongovernmental spending that could be transformed through technology, quoting Khosla's goal of creating a world where "7 billion people can have the lifestyle that the richest 700 million or 10% do now." Khosla has stated "we need 1,000% change if billions of people in China and India are to enjoy a Western, energy-rich lifestyle." He invests in "black swan" technologies that have a high chance of failure but if successful, would have environmental and societal benefits. In 2019, Khosla presented "Amazing: What KV Founders are Doing," which described 100 portfolio companies reinventing areas such as health, infrastructure, robotics, transportation, augmented reality and artificial intelligence. Khosla has stated that he has been unable to identify examples of major technological innovation originating from individuals who were long-established experts within a single field, arguing instead that transformative breakthroughs often come from founders applying cross-disciplinary thinking. He has cited companies such as Uber, Airbnb, SpaceX, Tesla, Amazon, and OpenAI as examples of startups that reshaped established industries.

Khosla Ventures was the first venture capital investor in OpenAI during a period when it was "almost impossible to diligence" due to the company's corporate structure. In 2018, Khosla Ventures committed $50 million to OpenAI, with the investment completed in 2019. It had a 5 percent stake in OpenAI at the time. The investment was more than twice the size of the firm's previous largest initial investment in a startup. Khosla later said that it was the largest initial investment he had made in four decades and attributed the size of the investment to his conviction that artificial intelligence would transform society. In 2023, Khosla used ChatGPT to help write a rap song for his daughter's wedding. In 2023, Khosla offered personal loans to startups after the collapse of Silicon Valley Bank. In 2023, in response to the removal of Sam Altman from OpenAI, Khosla suggested, on behalf of himself and Khosla Ventures, that Altman be reinstated. He later criticized Elon Musk for his breach of contract lawsuit against OpenAI and Altman, referring to it as "sour grapes" for failing to stay committed to the company. Khosla Ventures manages approximately $15 billion of investor capital as well as investments funded by Khosla himself. The firm was ranked #1 in the Founders Choice list of over 200 venture capital firms in 2023.

Khosla has been described by prominent technology executives and investors as an influential figure in venture capital. Marc Benioff, founder and CEO of Salesforce, called him "the preeminent venture capitalist of our time", while Bill Gates described him as having "a rare combination of being a visionary who possesses deep technical acumen." Venture capitalist Chamath Palihapitiya similarly described Khosla in 2021 as "simply the best venture capitalist of our generation", citing the breadth of his intellect, curiosity and investment success.

=== Acquisition of Seattle Seahawks: 2026–present ===
On July 11, 2026, the Khosla family entered into a formal agreement to purchase the Seattle Seahawks of the National Football League, with Vinod Khosla and his ownership group set to become the controlling owners of the NFL franchise. The purchase was approved on August 26, 2026 with the sale being finalized on September 3.

== Views ==
=== Venture assistant ===
Khosla rejects the title venture capitalist, calling himself a "venture assistant" helping entrepreneurs. He has argued that experience building companies is important when advising entrepreneurs, and has described his approach as preferring "brutal honesty to hypocritical politeness".

=== Politics ===
Khosla has donated to a mix of Democrats and Republicans and supports politicians based on their climate policies, but has exclusively supported Democratic presidential candidates since at least the 2010s. He hosted Barack Obama for a fundraising dinner in 2013, and Joe Biden in 2024 at his home in Portola Valley, California. Khosla endorsed Democratic candidate Hillary Clinton in the 2016 U.S. presidential election. Khosla was a major proponent of the "Yes on 87" campaign to pass California's Proposition 87, The Clean Energy Initiative, which failed to pass in November 2006.

With the withdrawal of Joe Biden from the 2024 United States presidential election, Khosla called for the Democratic Party to hold an open convention for its nominee. He said that it was "hard for me to support someone with no values, lies, cheats, rapes, demeans women, hates immigrants like me" in social media exchanges after Musk referenced supporting Donald Trump. Khosla pledged his support for Kamala Harris in July 2024 and joined "VCs for Kamala", a group of more than 100 tech investors and entrepreneurs signatories for Harris.

=== China ===
In May 2023, Khosla gave a presentation looking back from the year 2040 and examining how the Russian invasion of Ukraine and COVID-19 pandemic influenced the future. He argued that the Ukraine invasion started an energy transition and COVID-19 lockdowns in China moved global supply chains out of the country, starting one of the most powerful 20-year innovation cycles. Khosla has also stated that America is in a techno-economic war with China which it would lose upon slowing down the pace of AI development, while indicating that artificial general intelligence should be closed-source for national security. Khosla has said the U.S. will continue in the techno-economic war with China for the next 20 years.

Khosla's desire for a closed-source AGI is rooted in his concern over the United States' relationship with China, and compares the topic to the Manhattan Project. He debated the topic with venture capitalist Marc Andreessen over X in March 2024. Om Malik, a journalist, responded to Khosla's tweets saying "Social Media is the best thing that has happened for him because nothing (and no reporter for sure) can capture his true essence than what he shares on Twitter." In April 2024, Khosla wrote an op-ed in the Financial Times announcing his support of a bill that would force divestiture of TikTok from its parent company, ByteDance. He later wrote an open letter to the United States Senate urging it to pass the bill calling the social media platform a "weapon of war".

=== Artificial intelligence ===
In 2014, Khosla wrote about artificial intelligence and also stated that the value of "humanness" in occupational roles would become more valuable after the expansion of artificial intelligence, and have a "hugely deflationary" effect on the economy over the following 25 years. Khosla has stated that machine learning technology will replace many jobs and increase income disparities. He projected that 80 percent of all jobs will be eliminated with artificial intelligence having broader information and expertise in many industries and its growth will allow for universal basic income.

In April 2024, Khosla gave a TED talk on his predictions for the future, several of which involved technology and artificial intelligence. In October 2024, Khosla wrote "AI: Dystopia or Utopia?" on it being a transformative force capable of creating a world of abundance with both utopian and dystopian possibilities and a positive outcome achievable through thoughtful design.

== Philanthropy and affiliations ==
Khosla was honorary chair of the DonorsChoose San Francisco Bay Area advisory board. In 2000, he was a recipient of the Golden Plate Award of the American Academy of Achievement. In 2006, Khosla's wife Neeru co-founded the CK-12 Foundation, which aims to develop open-source textbooks and lower the cost of education in the U.S. and the rest of the world. Neeru Khosla founded and exclusively supports CK12.org, an organization that supports tens of millions of students and teachers per year with free educational content and services and is now on a mission to provide free AI tutors to every child on the planet. As of August 2020, CK12 had over 130 million students and teachers using their resources with registrations increasing by 460% as a result of COVID-19. Vinod Khosla and his wife have donated $500,000 to the Wikimedia Foundation.

In 2007, Khosla was an award recipient in the Northern California region for the EY Entrepreneur of the Year award. He was a member of the board of trustees of the Blum Center for Developing Economies at the University of California, Berkeley. The center is focused on finding solutions to address the crisis of extreme poverty and disease in the developing world. He is also one of the founders of TiE, The Indus Entrepreneurs, and has guest-edited a special issue of The Economic Times, a business newspaper in Mumbai, India. In 2009, he was awarded Champions of the Earth by the UNEP for in the Entrepreneurial Vision category for India. Also in 2009, he was awarded the Great Immigrants Award. Khosla was an early signatory to the Giving Pledge and sits on the Breakthrough Energy Ventures board.

He is involved with organizations providing microfinancing to small businesses in third-world countries and worked closely with Muhammad Yunus funding multiple organizations for both profit and non-profit. In 2023, Khosla signed a letter along with over 170 global figures to stop the "persecution" of Yunus. Khosla is on the board of trustees at Carnegie Mellon University in Pittsburgh. In April 2021, he made an offer to fund oxygen imports for hospitals in India amid the COVID-19 pandemic. He has since made many significant grants to several Covid related relief work projects in India including 10BedICU which has funded and created over 200 10BedICU across nine states.

== Martins Beach dispute ==
Since 2010, Khosla has been engaged in a legal dispute regarding public access to Martins Beach, several miles south of Half Moon Bay, California. Martins Beach is privately owned; its prior owners historically permitted public access upon payment of a fee. Khosla purchased the property adjacent to the beach and closed the road, stopping paid-for access, and posted “No Trespassing” signs, which became the subject of subsequent litigation.

In 2017, the California Courts of Appeal ruled that Khosla must obtain a Coastal Development Permit before closing the gate on Martins Beach Road, but the ruling did not establish a public right of access. In 2018, the U.S. Supreme Court declined to review that decision. In November 2019, the California Courts of Appeal held that prior owners' practice of charging a fee meant the public's use was by permission, not by right. In 2020, the California State Lands Commission and the California Coastal Commission jointly filed a lawsuit seeking to compel public access to Martins Beach under the California Coastal Act and related statutes. The case remains pending.

== Selected publications ==
- Khosla, Vinod (10 June 2026). "We will need a new tax code for the wealth AI creates". Financial Times.
- Khosla, Vinod (9 July 2025). "Vinod Khosla on how the anti-green agenda could help climate tech". The Economist.
- Mumgaard, Bob; Khosla, Vinod (7 January 2025). "Is the world ready for the transformational power of fusion?". World Economic Forum.
- Khosla, Vinod (8 November 2022). "Vinod Khosla says rushing to meet carbon-reduction targets by 2030 may hinder what can be achieved by 2050". The Economist.
- Khosla, Vinod (15 January 2012). "Will We Need Teachers Or Algorithms?". TechCrunch.
- Khosla, Vinod (10 January 2012). "Do We Need Doctors Or Algorithms?". TechCrunch.
- Khosla, Vinod (13 September 2017). "AI: Scary for the Right Reasons". HackerNoon.
- Emanuel, Ezekiel J.; Baker-Butler, Abe; Khosla, Neal; Khosla, Vinod (17 August 2026). "Will Autonomous AI Exceed AI-Aided Physicians as the Best Medical Care?". JAMA. doi:10.1001/jama.2026.15380.

== Selected talks and interviews ==
- 2022 – "Bloomberg Wealth with Vinod Khosla", interview with David Rubenstein, Bloomberg Wealth.
- 2024 – "12 Predictions for the Future of Technology", TED2024.
- 2026 – "Vinod Khosla: AI Tutors, Doctors & Farmer Experts For 1.5B Indians", India AI Impact Summit.
- 2025 – "Vinod Khosla on Green Tech Investment", Bloomberg.
- 2024 – "12 Entrepreneurs Can Address Society's Toughest Issues", Masters of Scale Summit.
- 2017 – "Re-inventing Societal Infrastructure with Technology", Slush.
- 2019 – "How to Build the Future", conversation with Sam Altman, Y Combinator.

Preceded by First	CEO of Sun Microsystems; 1982–1984	Succeeded by Scott McNealy
Preceded by First	Chairman of Sun Microsystems; 1982–1984	Succeeded by Scott McNealy
