= Means–ends analysis =

Problem solving technique

Means–ends analysis (MEA) is a problem solving technique used commonly in artificial intelligence (AI) for limiting search in AI programs. MEA was designed by two scientist Allen Newel and Herbert A. Simon in 1957, lateron, the idea of MEA led to the General Problem Solver, with J.C Shaw.

It is also a technique used at least since the 1950s as a creativity tool, most frequently mentioned in engineering books on design methods. MEA is also related to the means–ends chain approach used commonly in consumer behavior analysis. It is also a way to clarify one's thoughts when embarking on a mathematical proof.

== Problem-solving as search ==
An important aspect of intelligent behavior as studied in AI is goal-based problem solving, a framework in which the solution to a problem can be described by finding a sequence of actions that lead to a desirable goal. A goal-seeking system is supposed to be connected to its outside environment by sensory channels through which it receives information about the environment and motor channels through which it acts on the environment. (The term afferent is used to describe inward sensory flows, and efferent is used to describe outward motor commands.) In addition, the system has some means of storing in memory information about the state of the environment (afferent information) and information about actions (efferent information). Ability to attain goals depends on building up associations, simple or complex, between particular changes in states and particular actions that will bring these changes about. Search is the process of discovery and assembly of sequences of actions that will lead from a given state to a desired state. While this strategy may be appropriate for machine learning and problem solving, it is not always suggested for humans (e.g. cognitive load theory and its implications).

== How it works ==
The MEA technique is a strategy to control search in problem-solving. Given a current state and a goal state, an action is chosen which will reduce the difference between the two. The action is performed on the current state to produce a new state, and the process is recursively applied to this new state and the goal state.

In order for MEA to be effective, the goal-seeking system must have a means of associating to any kind of detectable difference those actions that are relevant to reducing that difference. It must also have means for detecting the progress it is making (the changes in the differences between the actual and the desired state), as some attempted sequences of actions may fail and, hence, some alternate sequences may be tried.

When knowledge is available concerning the importance of differences, the most important difference is selected first to further improve the average performance of MEA over other brute-force search strategies. However, even without the ordering of differences according to importance, MEA improves over other search heuristics–on average–by focusing the problem solving on the actual differences between the current state and that of the goal.

== AI use ==
The MEA technique as a problem-solving strategy was first introduced in 1961 by Allen Newell and Herbert A. Simon in their computer problem-solving program General Problem Solver (GPS). In that implementation, the correspondence between differences and actions, also called operators, is provided a priori as knowledge in the system. (In GPS, this knowledge was in the form of a table of connections.)

When the action and side-effects of applying an operator are penetrable, the search may select the relevant operators by inspection of the operators and do without a table of connections. This latter case, of which the canonical example is Stanford Research Institute Problem Solver (STRIPS), an automated planning computer program, allows task-independent correlation of differences to the operators which reduce them.

Prodigy, a problem solver developed in a larger learning-assisted automated planning project started at Carnegie Mellon University by Jaime Carbonell, Steven Minton and Craig Knoblock, is another system that used MEA.

Morten Lind at Technical University of Denmark has developed a tool called Multilevel Flow Modeling (MFM). It performs means–ends based diagnostic reasoning for industrial control and automation systems.

== See also ==
- Causal layered analysis
- Knowledge representation
- Automated reasoning
- Intelligent control
- Mathematical proof
- Futures techniques
- Polytely
- Gap analysis
- Hill climbing
