= Solver =

Software for a class of mathematical problems

A solver is a piece of mathematical software, possibly in the form of a stand-alone computer program or as a software library, that 'solves' a mathematical problem. A solver takes problem descriptions in some sort of generic form and calculates their solution. In a solver, the emphasis is on creating a program or library that can easily be applied to other problems of similar type.

== Solver types ==
Types of problems with existing dedicated solvers include:

- Linear and non-linear equations. In the case of a single equation, the "solver" is more appropriately called a root-finding algorithm.
- Systems of linear equations.
- Nonlinear systems.
- Systems of polynomial equations, which are a special case of nonlinear systems, better solved by specific solvers.
- Linear and non-linear optimisation problems
- Systems of ordinary differential equations
- Systems of differential algebraic equations
- Boolean satisfiability problems, including SAT solvers
- Quantified boolean formula solvers
- Constraint satisfaction problems
- Shortest path problems
- Minimum spanning tree problems
- Combinatorial optimization
- Game solvers for problems in game theory
- Three-body problem

The General Problem Solver (GPS) is a particular computer program created in 1957 by Herbert Simon, J. C. Shaw, and Allen Newell intended to work as a universal problem solver, that theoretically can be used to solve every possible problem that can be formalized in a symbolic system, given the right input configuration. It was the first computer program that separated its knowledge of problems (in the form of domain rules) from its strategy of how to solve problems (as a general search engine).

General solvers typically use an architecture similar to the GPS to decouple a problem's definition from the strategy used to solve it. The advantage in this decoupling is that the solver does not depend on the details of any particular problem instance. The strategy utilized by general solvers was based on a general algorithm (generally based on backtracking) with the only goal of completeness. This induces an exponential computational time that dramatically limits their usability. Modern solvers use a more specialized approach that takes advantage of the structure of the problems so that the solver spends as little time as possible backtracking.

For problems of a particular class (e.g., systems of non-linear equations) multiple algorithms are usually available. Some solvers implement multiple algorithms.

== See also ==
- Mathematical software for other types of mathematical software.
- Problem solving environment: a specialized software combining automated problem-solving methods with human-oriented tools for guiding the problem resolution.
- Satisfiability modulo theories for solvers of logical formulas with respect to combinations of background theories expressed in classical first-order logic with equality.
- Semantic reasoner

=== Lists of solvers ===
- List of linear programming solvers
- List of SMT solvers
- List of solvers for ordinary differential equations
