= Person =

Individual being

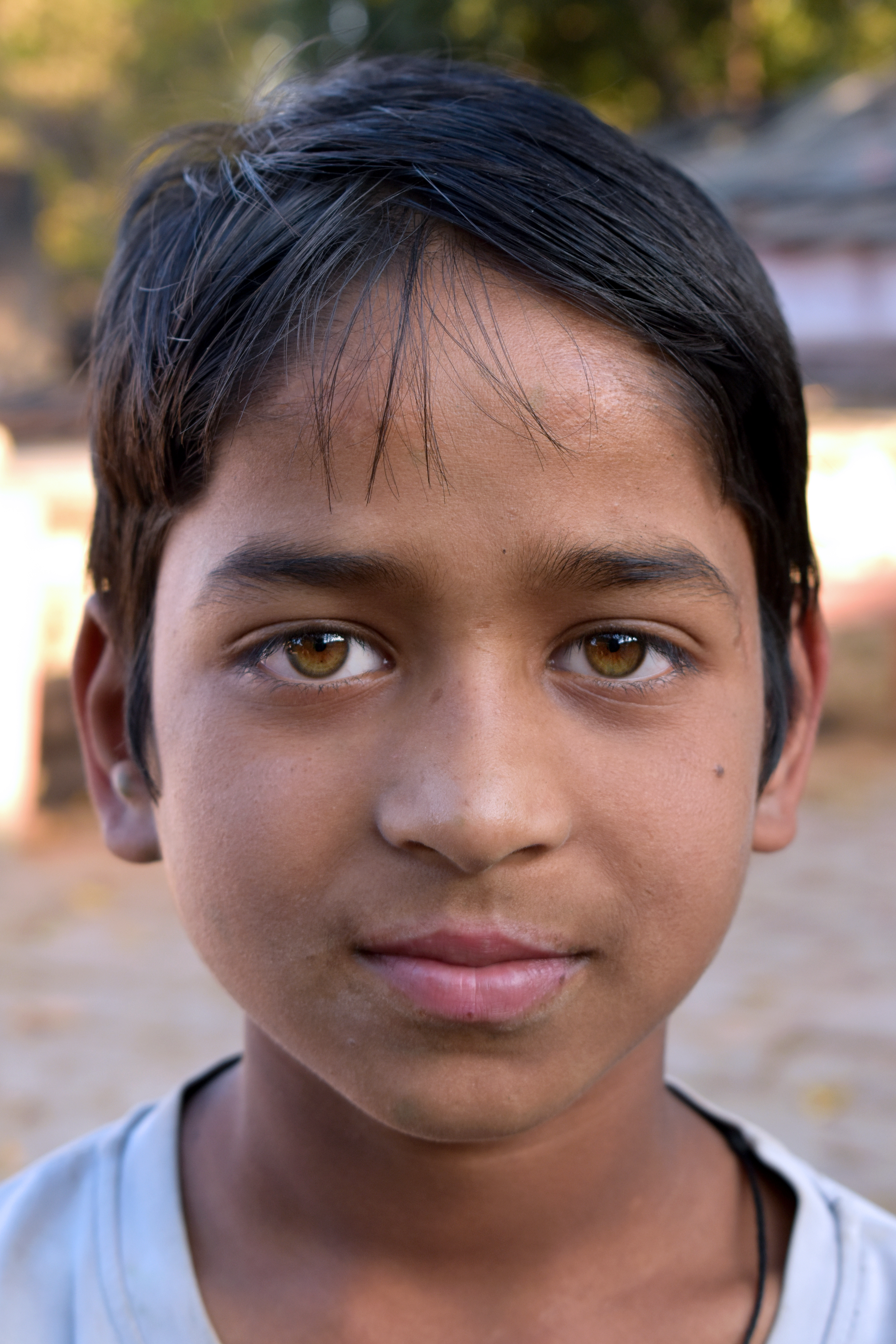
A 12-year-old male person

A person (pl.: people or persons, depending on context) is a being who has certain capacities or attributes such as reason, morality, consciousness or self-consciousness, and being a part of a culturally established form of social relations such as kinship, ownership of property, or legal responsibility. The defining features of personhood and, consequently, what makes a person count as a person, differ widely among cultures and contexts.

In addition to the question of personhood, of what makes a being count as a person to begin with, there are further questions about personal identity and self: both about what makes any particular person that particular person instead of another, and about what makes a person at one time the same person as they were or will be at another time despite any intervening changes.

The plural form "people" is often used to refer to an entire nation or ethnic group (as in "a people"), and this was the original meaning of the word; it subsequently acquired its use as a plural form of person. The plural form "persons" is often used in philosophical and legal writing.

== Personhood ==
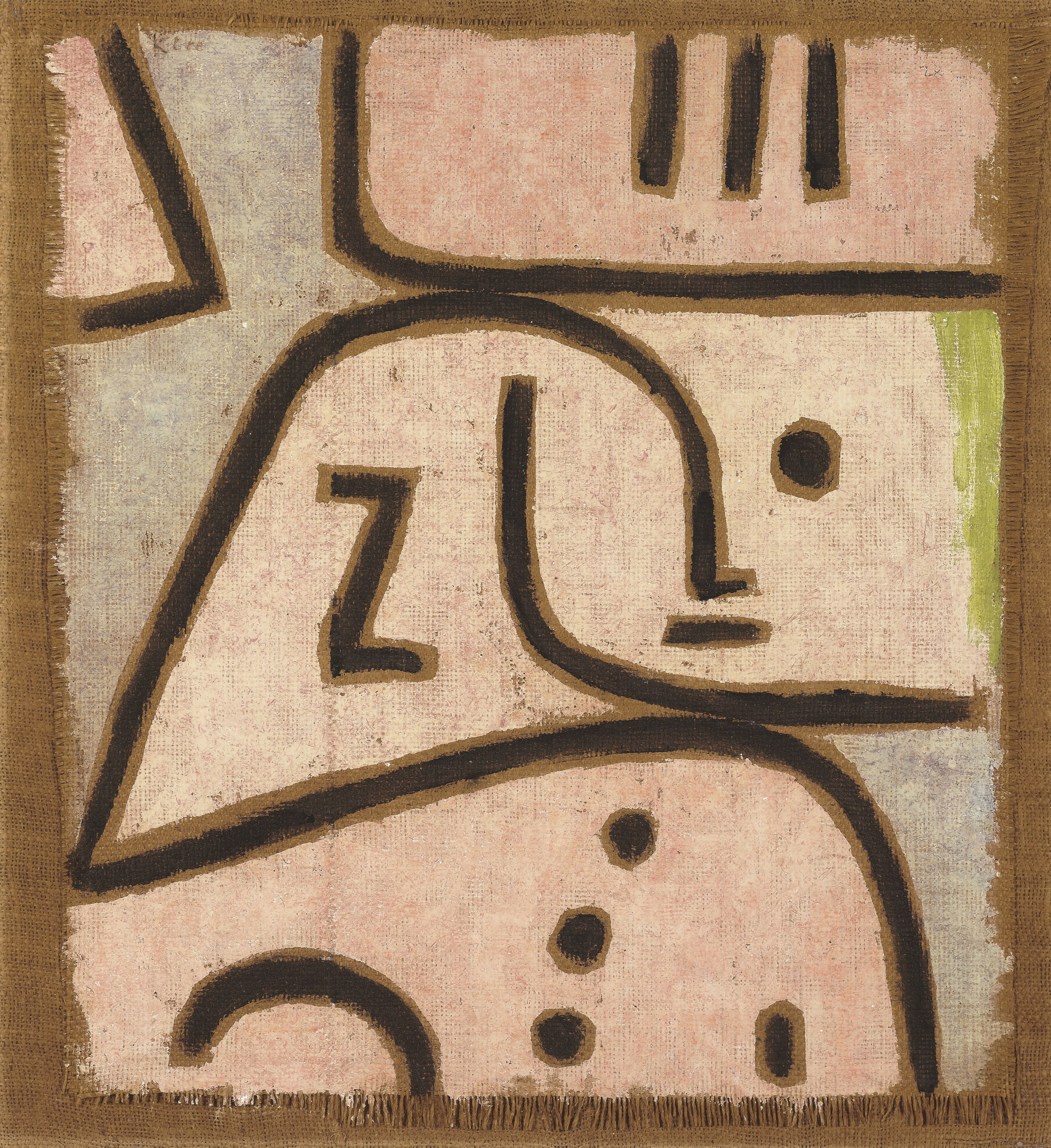
An abstract painting of a person by Paul Klee. The concept of a person can be very challenging to define.

The criteria for being a person... are designed to capture those attributes which are the subject of our most humane concern with ourselves and the source of what we regard as most important and most problematical in our lives.

— Harry G. Frankfurt

Personhood is the status of being a person. Defining personhood is a controversial topic in philosophy and law, and is closely tied to legal and political concepts of citizenship, equality, and liberty. According to common worldwide general legal practice, only a natural person or legal personality has rights, protections, privileges, responsibilities, and legal liability.

Personhood continues to be a topic of international debate, and has been questioned during the abolition of slavery and the fight for women's rights, in debates about abortion, fetal rights, and in animal rights advocacy.

Various debates have focused on questions about the personhood of different classes of entities. Historically, the personhood of women and slaves has been a catalyst of social upheaval. In most societies today, postnatal humans are defined as persons. Likewise, certain legal entities such as corporations, sovereign states and other polities, or estates in probate are legally defined as persons. However, some people believe that other groups should be included; depending on the theory, the category of "person" may be taken to include or not pre-natal humans or such non-human entities as animals, artificial intelligences, or extraterrestrial life.

== Personal identity ==
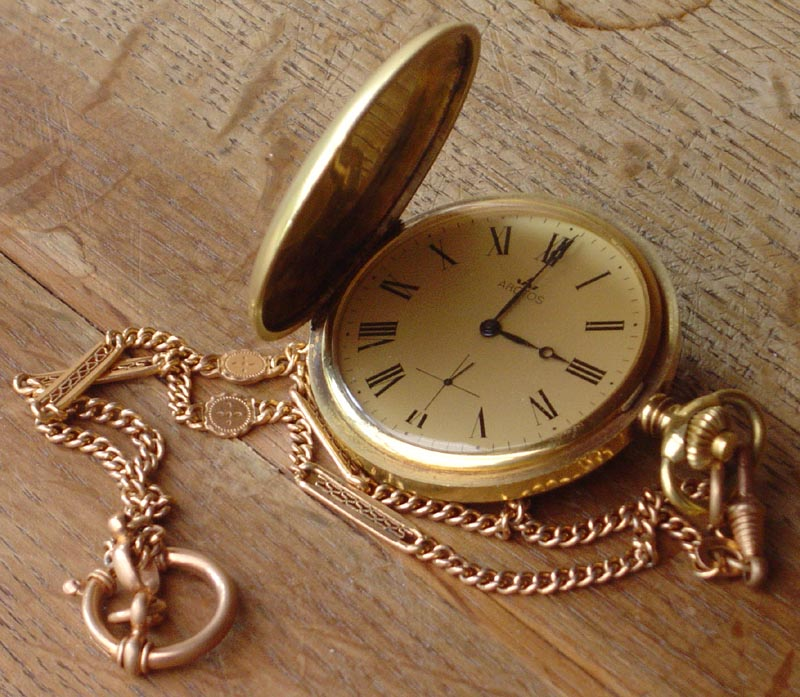
"What does it take for individuals to persist from moment to moment – or in other words, for the same individual to exist at different moments?"

Personal identity is the unique identity of persons through time. That is to say, the necessary and sufficient conditions under which a person at one time and a person at another time can be said to be the same person, persisting through time. In the modern philosophy of mind, this concept of personal identity is sometimes referred to as the diachronic problem of personal identity. The synchronic problem is grounded in the question of what features or traits characterize a given person at one time.

Identity is an issue for both continental philosophy and analytic philosophy. A key question in continental philosophy is in what sense we can maintain the modern conception of identity, while realizing many of our prior assumptions about the world are incorrect.

Proposed solutions to the problem of personal identity include continuity of the physical body, continuity of an immaterial mind or soul, continuity of consciousness or memory, the bundle theory of self, continuity of personality after the death of the physical body, and proposals that there are actually no persons or selves who persist over time at all.

== Development of the concept ==
In ancient Rome, the word persona (Latin) or prosopon (πρόσωπον; Ancient Greek) originally referred to the masks worn by actors on stage. The various masks represented the various "personae" in the stage play.

The concept of person was further developed during the Trinitarian and Christological debates of the 4th and 5th centuries in contrast to the word "nature". During the theological debates, some philosophical tools (concepts) were needed so that the debates could be held on common basis to all theological schools. The purpose of the debate was to establish the relation, similarities and differences between the logos (Ancient Greek: Λóγος, romanized: Lógos/Verbum) and God. The philosophical concept of person arose, taking the word "prosopon" (Ancient Greek: πρόσωπον, romanized: prósōpon) from the Greek theatre. Therefore, the logos (the Ancient Greek: Λóγος, romanized: Lógos/Verbum), which was identified with the Christ, was defined as a "person" of God. This concept was applied later to the Holy Ghost, the angels and to all human beings. Trinitarianism holds that God has three persons.

Since then, a number of important changes to the word's meaning and use have taken place, and attempts have been made to redefine the word with varying degrees of adoption and influence. According to Jörg Noller, at least six approaches can be distinguished:

1. "The ontological definition of the person as "an individual substance of a rational nature" (Boethius).
2. The self-consciousness-based definition of the person as a being that "can conceive itself as itself" (John Locke).
3. The moral-philosophical definition of the person as "an end in itself" (Immanuel Kant). In current analytical debate, the focus has shifted to the relationship between bodily organism and person.
4. The theory of animalism (Eric T. Olson) states that people are essentially animals and that mental or psychological attributes play no role in their identity.
5. Constitution theory (Lynne Baker), on the other hand, attempts to define the person as a natural and at the same time self-conscious being: the bodily organism constitutes the person without being identical to it. Rather, it forms with it a "unity without identity".
6. [... Another idea] for conceiving the natural-rational unity of the person has emerged recently in the concept of the "person life" (Marya Schechtman)."

Other theories attribute personhood to those states that are viewed to possess intrinsic or universal value. Value theory attempts to capture those states that are universally considered valuable by their nature, allowing one to assign the concept of personhood upon those states. For example, Chris Kelly argues that the value that is intuitively bestowed upon humans, their possessions, animals, and aspects of the natural environment is due to a value monism known as "richness." Richness, Kelly argues, is a product of the "variety" and the "unity" within an entity or agent. According to Kelly, human beings and animals are morally valued and entitled to the status of persons because they are complex organisms whose multitude of psychological and biological components are generally unified towards a singular purpose in any moment, existing and operating with relative harmony.

== See also ==
- Animal liberation
- Animal rights
- Anthropocentrism
- Anthropology
- Beginning of human personhood
- Being
- Capitis deminutio
- Character
- Consciousness
- Corporate personhood
- Great Ape personhood
- Hypostasis (philosophy and religion)
- Identity
- Individual
- Immanuel Kant
- Juridical person
- Legal personality
- Legal fiction
- Natural person in French law
- People
- Person (Catholic canon law)
- Personality
- Personhood movement
- Personoid
- Phenomenology
- Subject (philosophy)
- Surety
- Theory of mind
- Value Theory
