= Organization (disambiguation) =

An organization or organisation is a structured entity of people with a common goal.

Organization or organisation may also refer to:

== Arts and media ==
=== Music ===
- Organisation (album), 1980 album by Orchestral Manoeuvres in the Dark
- Organisation (band) (1969–1970), German band that was the predecessor to Kraftwerk
- The Organization (band) (1991–1995), heavy metal band from San Francisco, California
- Universal Zulu Nation, a.k.a. "The Organization", an international "hip hop awareness group"

=== Other media ===
- Organization (journal), an academic journal of management and organization studies
- The Organization (film), a 1971 American film
- Organizations (book), 1958 novel
- The Organization (TV series), a 1972 British television drama series
- Organization XIII, the villains in Kingdom Hearts: Chain of Memories and Kingdom Hearts II
- The Organization, the main antagonistic faction of the 2012 horror/comedy film The Cabin in the Woods.

== Other uses ==
- Formation of granulation tissue, in pathology
- The O (political group) ("The Organization"), in US, led by Theo Smith
- "The Organization", a former Cambodia governing body Angkar led by Pol Pot; see Communist Party of Kampuchea
- The Organization, an alternative name for the Chicago Outfit, a crime syndicate
- Organization (LDS Church), a secondary body of church government in the LDS Church

== See also ==
- Self-organization, the emergence of order in an initially disordered system
- Organizer (disambiguation)
- Organizing (disambiguation)
