= Animal rights (disambiguation) =

Animal rights is the idea that the most basic interests of non-human animals should be given the same consideration as the similar interests of human beings.

Animal rights may also refer to:

- Animal Rights (album), a 1996 album by Moby
- Animal Rights (instrumental), a 2010 instrumental by deadmau5 and Wolfgang Gartner
- Animals' Rights, an 1892 book by the English social reformer Henry Stephens Salt

== See also ==
- Animal rights movement
- Animal liberation (disambiguation)
