= Index of cognitive science articles =

Cognitive science is the scientific study either of mind or of intelligence (e.g. Luger 1994). Practically every formal introduction to cognitive science stresses that it is a highly interdisciplinary research area in which psychology, neuroscience, linguistics, philosophy, computer science (in particular artificial intelligence), anthropology, and biology are its principal specialized or applied branches. Therefore, we may distinguish cognitive studies of either human or animal brains, the mind and the brain.

== A ==
Alan Turing - anthropological linguistics - artificial intelligence - artificial life - attention - autism - anesthesia

== B ==
brain–computer interface - behavioral economics

== C ==
cognition - cognitive behaviour therapy - cognitive ergonomics - cognitive neuroscience - cognitive psychology - cognitive science - cognitive science of mathematics - Cognitive Science Society - cognitive therapy - collective intelligence - comparative linguistics - comparative method - comparative method (linguistics) - computational linguistics - computational semiotics - conceptual metaphor - connotation - constructed language - corpus linguistics - Creole language - cryptanalysis - cybernetics

== D ==
decipherment - descriptive linguistics

== E ==
embodied cognition - embodied philosophy - enactivism - ethnologue - etymology - evolutionary linguistics - epistemology - extended mind thesis

== F ==
figure of speech - formal language

== G ==
George Lakoff - general semantics

== H ==
H. Christopher Longuet-Higgins - Herbert A. Simon - historical-comparative linguistics - historical linguistics - history of linguistics - human–computer interaction

== I ==
Intelligence - International Phonetic Alphabet

== J ==
Jerry Fodor

== K ==
knowledge

== L ==
language - language acquisition - language families and languages - lexicography - lexicology - linguistic layers - linguistics - linguistics basic topics - linguistic relativity - list of famous linguists - list of linguistic topics - literal and figurative language - logical language

== M ==
machine learning - Marvin Minsky - metaphor - metonymy - Moral Politics - motor control - morpheme

== N ==
natural language understanding - neural network - neurolinguistics - neurophilosophy - neuroscience - Noam Chomsky

== O ==
orthography

== P ==
perception - philology - philosophy of language - philosophy of mind - phonetics - phonology - pidgin - pragmatics - prescription and description - profanity - psycholinguistics - psychology of reasoning - portage model

== Q ==
qualia - quantum cognition

== R ==
robotics

== S ==
Oliver Sacks - SAMPA - semantics - semiotics - social cognition - sociolinguistics - speaker recognition - speech communication - speech processing - speech recognition - speech synthesis - speech therapy - stratificational linguistics - structuralism - syntax

== T ==
theoretical linguistics - theory of computation - tongue-twister - transformational-generative grammar - Turing test

== U ==
unconscious mind

== V ==
visual agnosia

== W ==
Where Mathematics Comes From - writing systems
