= Organizing =

Organizing or organized may refer to:

- Organizing (management), a process of coordinating task goals and activities to resources
- Community organizing, in which communities come together to act in their shared self-interest
- Professional organizing, an industry build around creating organizational systems for individuals and businesses
- Union organizing, the process of establishing trade unions
  - Organizing Institute, a unit within the Organizing and Field Services Department of the American Federation of Labor and Congress of Industrial Organizations (AFL-CIO)
  - Organizing model, a broad conception of organizations such as trade unions
- Organizing principle, a core assumption from which everything else by proximity can derive a classification or a value
- Organizing vision, a term developed by E. Burton Swanson and Neil Ramiller that defines how a vision is formed, a vision of how to organize structures and processes in regard to an information systems innovation
- Organized (album), a 2000 album by Morgan Nicholls
- Sorting, any process of arranging items systematically
- Organize, a nonprofit organization founded by Greg Segal

== See also ==
- Organization (disambiguation)
- Organizer (disambiguation)
