= William F. Pounds =

William F. Pounds (1928–2023) was an American academic who served as the dean of the MIT Sloan School of Management from 1966 to 1980 and later as a professor emeritus at the MIT Sloan School of Management. He was chief financial adviser to the Rockefeller family and an executive in many of their holdings.

== Biography ==
Pounds attended Carnegie Mellon University where he graduated with a degree in chemical engineering and later earned masters and PhD degrees from Tepper School of Business, studying under Herbert Simon. He also served as a fighter pilot in the U.S. Navy during the Korean War.

Prior to his academic career, Pounds worked in operations management at Eastman Kodak and Pittsburgh Plate Glass, where he was involved in supplying automobile paint to General Motors. He joined MIT Sloan in 1961 at the invitation of then-dean Howard Johnson.

In 1969, amid campus protests against the U.S. Department of Defense's funding of MIT laboratories, Pounds led a review panel to evaluate the institution's relationship with military funding. The panel is now known as the Pounds Panel.

After his tenure as dean, Pounds served as a senior advisor to the Rockefeller family from 1981 to 1991. He was a member of several non-profit boards, including the Museum of Fine Arts Boston and WGBH. Pounds was also a member of the American Academy of Arts and Sciences.
