= EPAM =

Psychological learning theory computer program

EPAM (Elementary Perceiver and Memorizer) is a psychological theory of learning and memory implemented as a computer program. Originally designed by Herbert A. Simon and Edward Feigenbaum to simulate phenomena in verbal learning, it has been later adapted to account for data on the psychology of expertise and concept formation. It was influential in formalizing the concept of a chunk. In EPAM, learning consists in the growth of a discrimination network. EPAM was written in IPL/V.

The project was started in the late 1950s with the aim to learn nonsense syllables. The term nonsense is used because the learned patterns are not connected with a meaning but they are standing for their own. The software is working internally by creating a decision tree. An improved version is available under the name “EPAM-VI”.

== Related cognitive models ==
- CHREST
- Soar
