= Indiana Archives of Cognitive Science =

The Indiana Archives of Cognitive Science (IACS) is an online information portal providing information about the field of cognitive science. The purpose of IACS is to promote the study of cognitive science at the undergraduate level. The site provides information about history, current research trends, and career opportunities associated in cognitive science.

This site is also home to the Indiana Undergraduate Journal of Cognitive Science, an online journal of writing by undergraduate cognitive science students nationwide. Another feature of this website is an extensive listing of cognitive science programs across the nation, research and internship opportunities, a monthly reading list, and other links of interest to cognitive science students.

The Indiana Archives of Cognitive Science was developed and is maintained by undergraduate students in the Cognitive Science Program at Indiana University.
