= Organizer =

Organizer may refer to:

== Job descriptions ==
- Community organizer, an advocate leading or seeking to lead or influence a community seeking changes in government, corporations and/or other institutions
- Event manager, a person who organizes an event
- Party organizer, a political party official
- Professional organizer, a person who helps others get organized
- Union organizer, a trade union official

== Arts and media ==
- Organiser (magazine), an Indian Hindu nationalist magazine affiliated to the Rashtriya Swayamsevak Sangh
- The Organizer, a 1963 film co-written and directed by Mario Monicelli
- The Organizer (album)

== Other uses ==
- Personal organizer, a type of diary
  - Electronic organizer, an electronic version of an organizer
- Open Programming Language, initially called Organiser Programming Language
- Spemann-Mangold organizer, also called embryonic induction, a cell or tissue which sends signals to other cells to instruct the fate of these cells
- Organizer box

== See also ==
- Organization (disambiguation)
- Organizing (disambiguation)
