= CHREST =

CHREST (Chunk Hierarchy and REtrieval STructures) is a symbolic cognitive architecture based on the concepts of limited attention, limited short-term memories, and chunking. The architecture takes into low-level aspects of cognition such as reference perception, long and short-term memory stores, and methodology of problem-solving and high-level aspects such as the use of strategies. Learning, which is essential in the architecture, is modelled as the development of a network of nodes (chunks) which are connected in various ways. This can be contrasted with Soar and ACT-R, two other cognitive architectures, which use productions for representing knowledge. CHREST has often been used to model learning using large corpora of stimuli representative of the domain, such as chess games for the simulation of chess expertise or child-directed speech for the simulation of children's development of language. In this respect, the simulations carried out with CHREST have a flavour closer to those carried out with connectionist models than with traditional symbolic models.

CHREST stores its memories in a chunking network, a tree-like structure that connects and stores knowledge and information acquired, allowing for greater efficiency in information processing. Figure 1 highlights the links between perceived knowledge, memory, and acquired experiences that are formed based on “familiar patterns” between new and old information.

CHREST is developed by Fernand Gobet at Brunel University and Peter C. Lane at the University of Hertfordshire. It is the successor of EPAM, a cognitive model originally developed by Herbert A. Simon and Edward Feigenbaum.

== Architecture ==
The architecture contains a number of capacity parameters (e.g., capacity of visual short-term memory, set at three chunks) and time parameters (e.g., time to learn a chunk or time to put information into short-term memory). This makes it possible to derive precise and quantitative predictions about human behaviour.

The model includes interaction with elements in the external world, short-term and long-term memory stores, in particular visual and verbal memory storage, and the individual's mechanisms with problem-solving. Chunks in CHREST are referenced in short-term memory while being held in long-term memory, often recognised through neural categorial perception involving discrimination. In much similarity to EPAM, chunks in cognition learning in long-term memory are acquired as a “network of nodes”, and are interconnected by the similarity of their contents and are depicted as a discrimination network, storing and sorting chunks in the network. Chunks are essentially “clusters of information that can be used as units of perception”, thus when applied in situations of chess play, fragments and sections of chess positions will be used as the stimuli fed to the system. According to Gobet et al. and Smith et al., cognitive templates, or better known as schemas, form when chunks adapt based on recurring environmental patterns and structures. Templates are cognitive structures that represent environmental perception, allowing for cognitive organisation, recall, behavioural guidance, situational prediction and overall understanding. Each template has slots where values can be “slotted in”, which allows for faster understanding when faced with similar information already existing in the template.

Simulations are carried out by allowing the model to acquire knowledge by receiving stimuli representative of the domain under study. For example, during the learning phase of the chess simulations, the program incrementally acquires chunks and templates by scanning a large database of positions taken from master-level games. This makes it possible to create networks of various sizes, and so to simulate the behaviour of players of different skill levels. Taken together with the presence of time and capacity parameters, this enables CHREST to make unambiguous and quantitative predictions.

CHREST's notability lies in the significance placed on the perception process. The procedure of perception and information processing is passive, leading to complex emergent behaviour where the secondary acquisition process is led and directed by pre-existing knowledge. This phenomenon is closely observed in chess experiments, where perception and eye movements are closely associated, while also being proportionate to attention span. This process is governed by the chunks held in heuristics and memory . In the case of chess experiments, perception is equated with eye movements (which are approximately correspondent to attention), which are directed by chunks held in memory and heuristics .

Models based on CHREST have been used, among other things, to simulate data on the acquisition of chess expertise from novice to grandmaster, children's acquisition of vocabulary, children's acquisition of syntactic structures, and concept formation.

== Limitations ==
A glaring limitation of the CHREST theory is as proposed by Herbert Simon. Simon concluded models that attempted to simulate functioning cognition in humans must not assume properties that may be unrealistic for a human, thus the CHREST model is limited by the parameters of human abilities understood to the current extent of cognitive psychology. Moreover, an over-focus on problem-solving and strategy has led to information categorisation, attention, and understanding of the stimulus being ignored.

Time-restricted puzzles are simulated using a set of regulated parameters that are assumed to be closest to human behaviour. Time-related variables are commonly used in CHREST and its subsequent simulations, such as the main limiting factor of visual short-term memory being restricted. The algorithm takes into account the typical time spent when simulating a specific action, such as mentally calculating each position, and “increments the internal clock of the algorithm by the amount of time used”. As such, the parameters set out, such as the time constraint, result in time-restricted problems to be simulated to an extent, limited by “available and simulated resources”.

Additionally, extensive research conducted by Woollett and Maguire revealed that through acquiring expertise, such as in the case of London's taxi drivers, “structural plasticity in the hippocampus” is developed, creating “permanent changes in the brain” such as the expansion of the posterior hippocampal region relative to the average population. This change is achieved through memorisation and navigation of complicated routes and maps of London's urban area, leading to a rigid pattern of cognitive chunks that results in resistance to sudden modifications, as well as the development of “practised habits”. In the face of unfamiliar circumstances, the individual may depend on existing patterns and strategies despite if the knowledge may not be applicable. The plasticity of the information processing centre in the brain leads to potential “blind spots” when faced with situations that require visualisation external of preexisting patterns.

== Applications in Chess ==
The chess domain has long been a standardised testing protocol for studies involving perception, psychology, cognition, and human and artificial intelligence. The comprehensive use of chess play and chess mechanisms has been compared to the metaphor of the use of ‘drosophila’, the “organism of choice” for research in biological and chemical industries. Similarities between the domination of chess used as an experimental hotbed in the field of cognitive and computer sciences and the use of drosophila in genetic sciences research have been drawn up as chess has notably been identified as a “representative measure” of cognition and intelligence in both humans and computers.

Common applications and simulations of the CHREST theory have been carried out extensively in the past within the context of chess play. The methodology involves allowing the acquisition of knowledge by feeding stimuli within the specialisation of study. In the algorithm's learning phase, chunks and templates from databases containing moves, positions, and strategies from grandmaster and expert level games are gradually fed and synthesised as knowledge. Varying networks of nodes (or chunks) of different sizes are then created, which allows for simulations of chess play across diverse levels of skill. Parameters of time and human capacity are taken into account, thus ideally creating circumstances where CHREST is able to quantitatively predict unambiguous outcomes (Gobet and Lane; Gobet).

Additional research credited to Adriaan de Groot and Herbert Simon specifically in the domain of chess accounted for significant quantities of psychological data, with a strong focus on the memory of chess players. Prior to de Groot and Simon's theories and implementation, the standard paradigm for experimentation in chess play and chess research typically consists of illustrating a chess position to a subject for a short period of time, usually for 5 seconds, then asking subjects to recreate the position. Common independent variables in this methodology are the skill level of the subject, time spent illustrating the position, and the general depth and significance of the position.

In the domain of perception, simulations of eye movement during the initial 5 seconds of illustrating a chess position, as well as recognition of templates and chunks have been completed using CHREST. CHREST also accounts for the outcome when presented with varying modifications and randomisation of positions, the significance of time spent illustrating and presenting each position, and the categorisation of the errors made and chunks replaced in the network across varying skill levels from novice-level players to grandmasters.

=== Chess expertise in relation to ageing ===
Extensive research has been conducted by N Charness on chess and general expertise, problem-solving strategies and memorisation by population groups of different ages. Tests for memorisation and recall revealed that younger players performed better relative to older players when presented with varying chess positions. Charness noted that though older players performed worse relative to younger players when both parties were on the same level, the skill level of older players equalled that of younger players in strategy-based tasks that required the player to select the best play within a time constraint, where older players outpaced younger players. The legitimate interpretation of Charness’ experiment is refuted by Retschitzki et al., who identify key issues in Charness’ methodology that leads to an inaccurate conclusion. Retschitzki et al. suggest the decline of the skill level of the older players as a consequence of reaching and passing their peak, and explicit comparison to a younger age group was complicated due to “prior learning and past experiences”, also referred to as “crystallised intelligence”.

== Previous Experimental Methodology ==
Prior to de Groot and Simon's theories and implementation, the standard paradigm for experimentation in chess play and chess research typically consists of illustrating a chess position to a subject for a short period of time, usually for 5 seconds, then asking subjects to recreate the position. Common independent variables in this methodology are the skill level of the subject, time spent illustrating the position, and the general depth and significance of the position. Though this methodology has generated a substantial amount of high-level models addressing memory and cognition in chess play, exampled by the works of Dennis Holding, there remains a scarcity of models that further detail memory use in chess, with the exemption of MAPP developed by Chase and Simon, later implemented by Simon and Gilmartin.
