= Personoid =

AI concept

Personoid is the concept coined by Stanisław Lem, a Polish science-fiction writer, in Non Serviam, from his book A Perfect Vacuum (1971). His personoids are an abstraction of functions of human mind and they live in computers; they do not need any human-like physical body.

In cognitive and software modeling, personoid is a research approach to the development of intelligent autonomous agents. In frame of the IPK (Information, Preferences, Knowledge) architecture, it is a framework of abstract intelligent agent with a cognitive and structural intelligence. It can be seen as an essence of high intelligent entities.

From the philosophical and systemics perspectives, personoid societies can also be seen as the carriers of a culture. According to N. Gessler, the personoids study can be a base for the research on artificial culture and culture evolution.

== Personoids on TV and cinema ==
- Welt am Draht (1973)
- The Thirteenth Floor (1999)

== See also ==
- Android
- Humanoid
- Intelligence
- Artificial Intelligence
- Culture
- Computer Science
- Cognitive Science
- Anticipatory science
- Memetics
