= James V. Wertsch =

James V. Wertsch (born May 16, 1947) is the David R. Francis Distinguished Professor Emeritus and Director Emeritus of the McDonnell International Scholars Academy at Washington University in St. Louis.

== Education and career ==
Wertsch received an A.B. in psychology from University of Illinois, Urbana in 1969, an M.A.T. in education from Northwestern University in 1971, and a PhD in educational psychology from the University of Chicago in 1975. After finishing his Ph.D, he was a postdoctoral fellow at the USSR Academy of Sciences and Moscow State University, where he studied with the neuropsychologist Alexander R. Luria.

From 2012 to 2018 he also served as vice chancellor for international relations at Washington University in St. Louis. A professor of sociocultural anthropology, Wertsch studies national narratives and memory, collective memory and identity, especially in Russia and other countries of the former Soviet Union, as well as in the United States.

His publications include the volumes Vygotsky and the Social Formation of Mind (1985), Voices of the Mind (1991), Mind as Action (1998), Voices of Collective Remembering (2002), and How Nations Remember: A Narrative Approach (2021).

Wertsch has held faculty positions at Northwestern University in the department of linguistics, the University of California, San Diego in the department of communication, Clark University in the department of psychology, and Washington University in St. Louis in the department of anthropology.

In addition, he has been a visiting professor at the University of Utrecht (Belle van Zuylen Research Professor), Moscow State University (Fulbright Senior Lecturer), the University of Seville, Swedish Collegium for Advanced Study in Uppsala, Bristol University, and the University of Oslo.

He is also an honorary member of the Russian Academy of Education, and he has served as a guest professor at the University of Oslo in Norway, Tsinghua University in Beijing, and at Fudan University in Shanghai.

Wertsch is a fellow in the American Academy of Arts and Sciences and the Russian Academy of Education, and he holds honorary degrees from Linköping University and the University of Oslo.

== Books ==
- Wertsch, James V. (1993-03-15). Voices of the Mind: Sociocultural Approach to Mediated Action (Reprint ed.). Harvard University Press. ISBN 9780674943049.
- Harvard University Press ~ Vygotsky and the Social Formation of Mind. Harvard University Press. 15 October 1988. ISBN 9780674943513.
- "Mind As Action". global.oup.com.
- Wertsch, James V. (1999-01-01). La Mente en acción (in Spanish). Aique. ISBN 9789507015472.
- "Voices of Collective Remembering". Cambridge University Press.
