= Organizations (book) =

Book by James G. March and Herbert A. Simon

Organizations is a book by James G. March and Herbert A. Simon.
