= Cliff Shaw =

Computer scientist (1922-1991)

John Clifford Shaw
- Born: February 23, 1922
- Died: February 9, 1991 (aged 68)
- Occupation: Systems programmer
- Years active: 1950s–1990s
- Known for: Logic Theorist, General Problem Solver, Information Processing Language, linked list

John Clifford Shaw (February 23, 1922 – February 9, 1991) was a systems programmer at the RAND Corporation. He is a coauthor of the first artificial intelligence program, the Logic Theorist, and was one of the developers of General Problem Solver (universal problem solver machine) and Information Processing Language (a programming language of the 1950s). Shaw is considered the true "father" of the JOSS language. One of the most significant events that occurred in the programming was the development of the concept of list processing by Allen Newell, Herbert A. Simon and Cliff Shaw during the development of the language IPL-V. He invented the linked list, which remains fundamental in many strands of modern computing technology.
