= Goal seeking =

Computing and logic method

In computing, goal seeking is the ability to calculate backward to obtain an input that would result in a given output. This can also be called what-if analysis or backsolving. It can either be attempted through trial and improvement or more logical means. Basic goal seeking functionality is built into most modern spreadsheet packages such as Microsoft Excel.

According to O'Brien and Marakas, optimization analysis is a more complex extension of goal-seeking analysis. Instead of setting a specific target value for a variable, the goal is to find the optimum value for one or more target variables, given certain constraints. Then one or more other variables are changed repeatedly, subject to the specified constraints, until you discover the best values for the target variables.

== Examples ==
Suppose a family wanted to take out the biggest loan that they could afford to pay for. If they set aside $500 a month, the goal-seeking program would try to work out how big a loan the family could afford to take out. Even using simple trial and improvement, a computer could quickly determine that they could not afford a $50,000 loan, but could afford a $48,000 loan. It would then repeat the process until it had reached a figure such as $48,476.34, which would give them a monthly repayment as close to $500 as possible, without exceeding it.

A more efficient method, especially on more complicated calculations, would be for the program to logically work through the argument. By drawing up a simple equation, the program could come to the conclusion that the output equalled one ninety-sixth of the input, and could then multiply the output (or goal) by ninety-six to find the necessary input.

== See also ==
- Global optimization
- Goal programming
