= Animal liberation =

Animal liberation may refer to:

== Philosophies ==
- Animal rights, animals' interests being assigned moral weight
  - Animal liberation movement
  - Abolitionism (animal rights), an abolitionist approach to animal rights
  - Veganarchism, a combined theory of animal liberation and anarchism
  - Anarchism and animal rights

== Organizations ==
- Animal Liberation (organisation), animal rights organisation based in Sydney, NSW
- Animal Liberation Victoria
- Animal Liberation Front
- Animal Liberation Front Supporters Group
- Revolutionary Cells – Animal Liberation Brigade
- Animal Liberation Press Office

== Other uses ==
- Animal Liberation (book), 1975 book by philosopher Peter Singer
- Animal Liberation (album), 1987 compilation album from WaxTrax records
- Life release, a traditional Buddhist practise to save lives of beings
