= Learning engineering =

Interdisciplinary academic field

Learning Engineering is the systematic application of evidence-based principles and methods from educational technology and the learning sciences to create engaging and effective learning experiences, support the difficulties and challenges of learners as they learn, and come to better understand learners and learning. It emphasizes the use of a human-centered design approach in conjunction with analyses of rich data sets to iteratively develop and improve those designs to address specific learning needs, opportunities, and problems, often with the help of technology. Working with subject-matter and other experts, the Learning Engineer deftly combines knowledge, tools, and techniques from a variety of technical, pedagogical, empirical, and design-based disciplines to create effective and engaging learning experiences and environments and to evaluate the resulting outcomes. While doing so, the Learning Engineer strives to generate processes and theories that afford generalization of best practices, along with new tools and infrastructures that empower others to create their own learning designs based on those best practices.

Supporting learners as they learn is complex, and design of learning experiences and support for learners usually requires interdisciplinary teams.

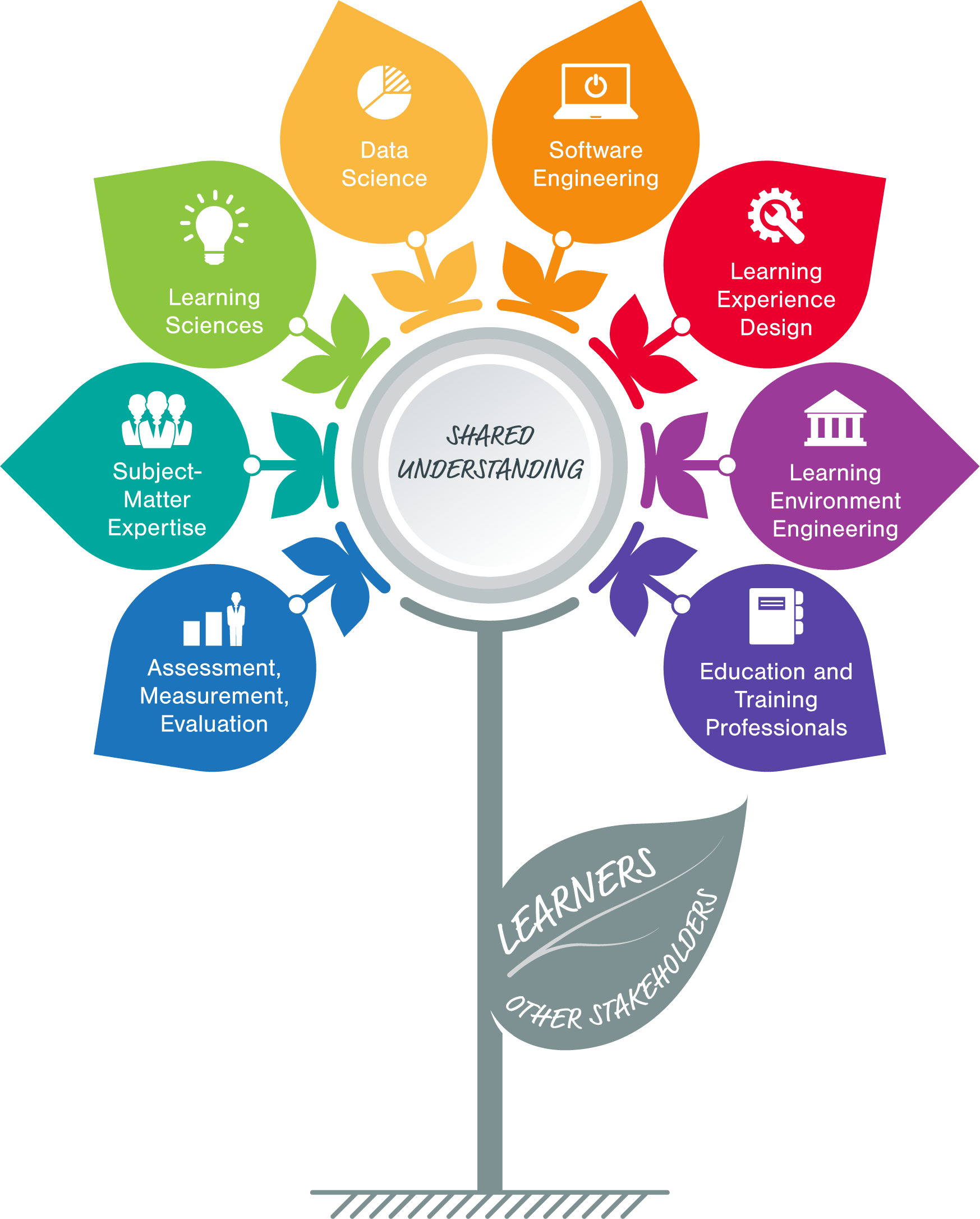
Supporting learners as they learn is complex, and design of learning experiences and support for learners usually requires interdisciplinary teams.

Learning engineers themselves might specialize in designing learning experiences that unfold over time, engage the population of learners, and support their learning; automated data collection and analysis; design of learning technologies; design of learning platforms; improve environments or conditions that support learning; or some combination. The products of learning engineering teams include on-line courses (e.g., a particular MOOC), software platforms for offering online courses, learning technologies (e.g., ranging from physical manipulatives to electronically-enhanced physical manipulatives to technologies for simulation or modeling to technologies for allowing immersion), after-school programs, community learning experiences, formal curricula, and more. Learning engineering teams require expertise associated with the content that learners will learn, the targeted learners themselves, the venues in which learning is expected to happen, educational practice, software engineering, and sometimes even more.

Learning engineering teams employ an iterative design process for supporting and improving learning. Initial designs are informed by findings from the learning sciences. Refinements are informed by analysis of data collected as designs are carried out in the world. Methods from learning analytics, design-based research, and rapid large-scale experimentation are used to evaluate designs, inform refinements, and keep track of iterations. According to the IEEE Standards Association's IC Industry Consortium on Learning Engineering, "Learning Engineering is a process and practice that applies the learning sciences using human-centered engineering design methodologies and data-informed decision making to support learners and their development."

== History ==
=== Early history ===
Herbert Simon, a cognitive psychologist and economist, first coined the term learning engineering in 1967. However, associations between the two terms learning and engineering began emerging earlier, in the 1940s and as early as the 1920s. Simon argued that the social sciences, including the field of education, should be approached with the same kind of mathematical principles as other fields like physics and engineering.

=== Formal Recognition as a Process and Practice ===
Simon’s ideas about learning engineering continued to reverberate at Carnegie Mellon University, but the term did not catch on until businessman Bror Saxberg began promoting it in 2014 after visiting Carnegie Mellon University and the Pittsburgh Science of Learning Center, or LearnLab for short. Bror Saxberg brought his team from the for-profit education company, Kaplan, to visit CMU. The team went back to Kaplan with what we now call learning engineering to enhance, optimize, test, and sell their educational products. While still at Kaplan, he was an advisor to education-focussed philanthropic initiatives and later joined the Chan Zuckerberg Initiative (CZI) as Vice President, Learning Science Vice President, Learning Science. While at Kaplan Bror Saxberg co-write with Frederick Hess, founder of the American Enterprise Institute's Conservative Education Reform Network, the 2014 book using the term learning engineering. Then while at the Chan Zuckerberg Initiative Bror Saxberg co-wrote with Christopher Dede the Timothy E. Wirth Professor in Learning Technologies at the Harvard Graduate School of Education and John Richards the 2019 book Learning Engineering for Online Education.

==== International Consortium for Innovation and Collaboration in Learning Engineering ====
In 2017, the IEEE Standards Association formed the IC Industry Consortium on Learning Engineering as a part of its Industry Connections program.

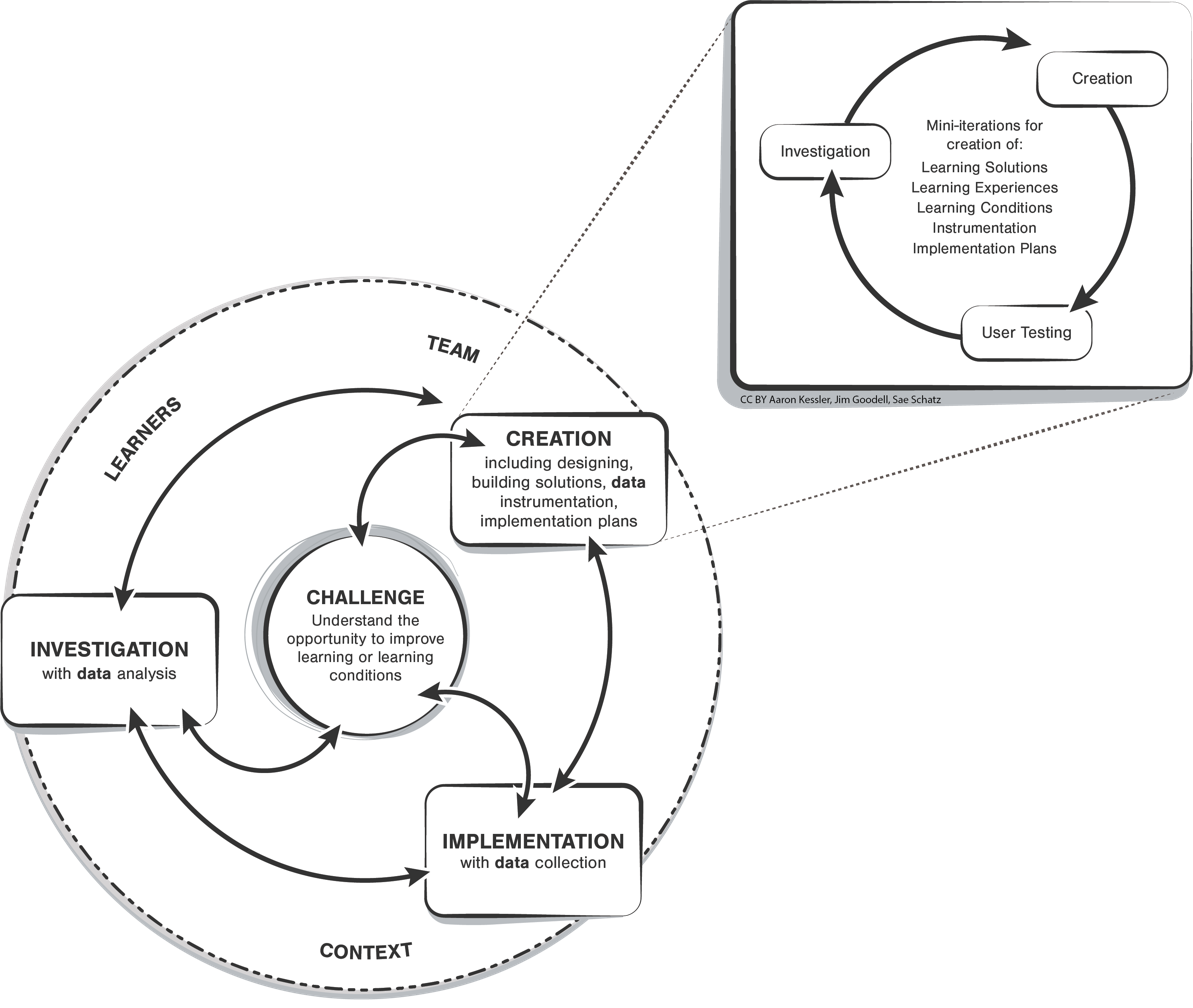
Learning engineering is an iterative process, informed by data, that starts with a challenge in context. The Creation stage may use iterative human-centered design-build cycles.

Between 2017 and 2019, ICICLE formed eight Special Interest Groups (SIGs) as a collaborative resource to support the growth of Learning Engineering. The Curriculum, and Credentials SIG chaired by Kenneth Koedinger pioneered the work on a formal definition of learning engineering. Later work by the Design SIG led by Aaron Kessler led to the development of a learning engineering process model. In 2024 ICICLE changed its name to International Consortium for Innovation and Collaboration in Learning Engineering and became part of the IEEE Learning Technology Standards Committee.

==== Enterprise Learning Engineering Center of Excellence ====
On 1 December 2024 the United_States_Air_Force Air_Education_and_Training_Command (AETC) established the Enterprise_Learning_Engineering_Center_of_Excellence (ELE CoE) "to directly support development and delivery of Mission Ready Airmen and Guardians to Joint Force Commanders with the competencies needed to deter or defeat great power competitors." The ELE CoE is dedicated to the systematic application of evidence-based principles, scientific methods and practices from the learning sciences, education research, and systems-thinking to produce effective, Airmen-centered learning outcomes and competency acquisition.

== Overview ==
Learning Engineering is aimed at addressing a deficit in the application of science and engineering methodologies to education and training. Its advocates emphasize the need to connect computing technology and generated data with the overall goal of optimizing learning environments.

Learning Engineering initiatives aim to improve educational outcomes by leveraging computing to dramatically increase the applications and effectiveness of learning science as a discipline. Digital learning platforms have generated large amounts of data which can reveal immediately actionable insights.

The Learning Engineering field has the further potential to communicate educational insights automatically available to educators. For example, learning engineering techniques have been applied to the issue of drop-out or high failure rates. Traditionally, educators and administrators have to wait until students actually withdraw from school or nearly fail their courses to accurately predict when the drop out will occur. Learning engineers are now able to use data on off-task behavior or wheel spinning to better understand student engagement and predict whether individual students are likely to fail.

This data enables educators to spot struggling students weeks or months prior to being in danger of dropping out. Proponents of Learning Engineering posit that data analytics will contribute to higher success rates and lower drop-out rates.

Learning Engineering can also assist students by providing automatic and individualized feedback.

Carnegie Learning’s tool LiveLab, for instance, employs big data to create a learning experience for each student user by, in part, identifying the causes of student mistakes. Research insights gleaned from LiveLab analyses allow teachers to see student progress in real-time.

== Common approaches ==
=== A/B Testing ===
A/B testing compares two versions of a given program and allows researchers to determine which approach is most effective. In the context of Learning Engineering, platforms like TeacherASSIST and Coursera use A/B testing to determine which type of feedback is the most effective for learning outcomes.

Neil Heffernan’s work with TeacherASSIST includes hint messages from teachers that guide students toward correct answers. Heffernan’s lab runs A/B tests between teachers to determine which type of hints result in the best learning for future questions.

UpGrade is an open-source platform for conducting A/B testing and large-sclae field experiments in education. It allows EdTech companies to run experiments within their own software. ETRIALS leverages ASSISTments and give scientists freedom to run experiments in authentic learning environments. Terracotta is a research platform that supports teachers' and researchers' abilities to easily run experiments in live classes.

=== Educational Data Mining ===
Educational Data Mining involves analyzing data from student use of educational software to understand how software can improve learning for all students. Researchers in the field, such as Ryan Baker at the University of Pennsylvania, have developed models of student learning, engagement, and affect to relate them to learning outcomes.

=== Platform Instrumentation ===
Education tech platforms link educators and students with resources to improve learning outcomes.

=== Dataset Generation ===
Datasets provide the raw material that researchers use to formulate educational insights. For example, Carnegie Mellon University hosts a large volume of learning interaction data in LearnLab's DataShop. Their datasets range from sources like Intelligent Writing Tutors to Chinese tone studies to data from Carnegie Learning’s MATHia platform.

Kaggle, a hub for programmers and open source data, regularly hosts machine learning competitions. In 2019, PBS partnered with Kaggle to create the 2019 Data Science Bowl. The DataScience Bowl sought machine learning insights from researchers and developers, specifically into how digital media can better facilitate early-childhood STEM learning outcomes.

Datasets, like those hosted by Kaggle PBS and Carnegie Learning, allow researchers to gather information and derive conclusions about student outcomes. These insights help predict student performance in courses and exams.

=== Learning Engineering in Practice ===
Combining education theory with data analytics has contributed to the development of tools that differentiate between when a student is wheel spinning (i.e., not mastering a skill within a set timeframe) and when they are persisting productively. Tools like ASSISTments alert teachers when students consistently fail to answer a given problem, which keeps students from tackling insurmountable obstacles, promotes effective feedback and educator intervention, and increases student engagement.

Studies have found that Learning Engineering may help students and educators to plan their studies before courses begin. For example, UC Berkeley Professor Zach Pardos uses Learning Engineering to help reduce stress for community college students matriculating into four-year institutions. Their predictive model analyzes course descriptions and offers recommendations regarding transfer credits and courses that would align with previous directions of study.

Similarly, researchers Kelli Bird and Benjamin Castlemen’s work focuses on creating an algorithm to provide automatic, personalized guidance for transfer students. The algorithm is a response to the finding that while 80 percent of community college students intend to transfer to a four-year institution, only roughly 30 percent actually do so. Such research could lead to a higher pass/fail rate and help educators know when to intervene to prevent student failure or drop out.

== Criticisms of learning engineering ==
Researchers and educational technology commentators have published critiques of learning engineering. The criticisms raised include that learning engineering misrepresents the field of learning sciences and that despite stating it is based on cognitive science, it actually resembles a return to behaviorism. Others have also commented that learning engineering exists as a form of surveillance capitalism. Other fields, such as instructional systems design, have criticized that learning engineering rebrands the work of their own field.

Still others have commented critically on learning engineering's use of metaphors and figurative language. Often a term or metaphor carries a different meaning for professionals or academics from different domains. At times a term that is used positively in one domain carries a strong negative perception in another domain.

== Challenges for learning engineering teams ==
The multidisciplinary nature of learning engineering creates challenges. The problems that learning engineering attempts to solve often require expertise in diverse fields such as software engineering, instructional design, domain knowledge, pedagogy/andragogy, psychometrics, learning sciences, data science, and systems engineering. In some cases, an individual Learning Engineer with expertise in multiple disciplines might be sufficient. However, learning engineering problems often exceed any one person’s ability to solve.

A 2021 convening of thirty learning engineers produced recommendations that key challenges and opportunities for the future of the field involve enhancing R&D infrastructure, supporting domain-based education research, developing components for reuse across learning systems, enhancing human-computer systems, better engineering implementation in schools, improving advising, optimizing for the long-term instead of short-term, supporting 21st-century skills, improved support for learner engagement, and designing algorithms for equity.

== See also ==
- Learning sciences
- Instructional Design
- Adaptive Learning
- Human-Computer Interaction
