= Ryan S. Baker =

Australian academic

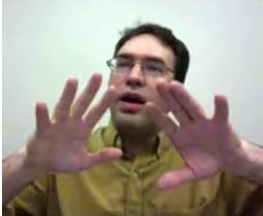
- Born: 1977 (age 48–49)
- Education: Carnegie Mellon University (PhD)
- Scientific career
- Fields: Learning Analytics, Educational Data Mining
- Workplaces: University of South Australia, University of Pennsylvania, Teachers College, Columbia University, Worcester Polytechnic Institute
- Academic advisors: Kenneth Koedinger, Albert T. Corbett

Ryan S. Baker (born 1977 in Naperville, Illinois) is Professor of Artificial Intelligence and Education at Adelaide University. He is known for his role in establishing the educational data mining scientific community, for the Baker Rodrigo Ocumpaugh Monitoring Protocol (BROMP), and for establishing the first automated detector of student disengagement. He was awarded the Educational Research Award for 2018 by the Council of Scientific Society Presidents, and has twice won the Prof. Ram Kumar Educational Data Mining Test of Time Award.

== Early life and education ==
After graduating from the Texas Academy of Mathematics and Science, Baker received a Sc.B. in Computer Science (2000) at Brown University, and his Ph.D. (2005) in Human–Computer Interaction from Carnegie Mellon University's School of Computer Science. His doctoral advisers were Kenneth Koedinger and Albert T. Corbett.

== Career ==
Baker is Professor of Artificial Intelligence and Education at Adelaide University. Previously, he was Professor at the University of Pennsylvania. Before that, Baker was an associate professor in the Department of Human Development at Teachers College, Columbia University from 2013 to 2016; and an assistant professor at Worcester Polytechnic Institute from 2009-2012. He also served as the Julius and Rosa Sachs Distinguished Lecturer at Teachers College, Columbia University from 2012-2013.

Baker is Associate Editor of the Journal of Educational Data Mining.

Baker was Founding President of the International Educational Data Mining Society. He served as founding Director of the Pittsburgh Science of Learning Center DataShop, at one time the world's largest public repository for educational interaction data.

Baker taught the MOOC Big Data and Education multiple times, on both the Coursera and edX platforms. He also founded the world's first Masters program in Learning analytics.

=== Research ===
Baker developed automated detectors that make inferences in real-time about students' affect and motivational and meta-cognitive behaviors, including the first automated detector of student disengagement, and work to link these constructs to long-term student achievement. These automated detectors have been embedded into several online learning systems used at scale in the United States, including ASSISTments.

Baker's research to develop automated detectors of engagement also led to the development of Baker Rodrigo Ocumpaugh Monitoring Protocol (BROMP), a protocol for classroom observation that has been used to study student engagement in a range of settings, including research on traditional classroom practices and informal field education.

=== Collaborations ===
Baker has co-authored peer-reviewed scientific papers with over 500 other scientists, including Neil Heffernan, Vincent Aleven, Bruce McLaren, Arthur C. Graesser, George Siemens, and Dragan Gasevic leading to him being listed as one of the most collaborative scientists in his field. Baker has over 500 papers, with over 30,000 citations and an h-index over 60.
