= Albert T. Corbett =

American psychologists

- Education: Brown University, University of Oregon (PhD)
- Scientific career
- Fields: Cognitive psychology, human–computer interaction
- Workplaces: Carnegie Mellon University, University of South Carolina

Albert T. Corbett is an associate research professor emeritus of human–computer interaction at Carnegie Mellon University. He is widely known for his role in the development of the Cognitive Tutor software, leading to one article with over 1,000 citations. Along with John Robert Anderson, he developed the Bayesian knowledge tracing algorithm, which is used in Cognitive Tutor software. This work has been particularly influential in the educational data mining community—over half of the EDM conference papers published in 2011 and 2012 cited Bayesian knowledge-tracing. Corbett studied psychology at Brown University, and obtained a doctorate in psychology from the University of Oregon. His doctoral advisor was Wayne Wickelgren.

== See also ==
- Cognitive Tutor
- Learning sciences
- ACT-R
- John Robert Anderson (psychologist)
- Kenneth Koedinger

== Current papers ==
- Corbett, A.T. and Anderson, J.R. (2001). "Locus of feedback control in computer-based tutoring: Impact on learning rate, achievement and attitudes." Proceedings of ACM CHI'2001 Conference on Human Factors in Computing Systems, 245–252.
- Corbett, A.T., McLaughlin, M.S., Scarpinatto, K.C. and Hadley, W.S. (2000). "Analyzing and Generating Mathematical Models: An Algebra II Cognitive Tutor Design Study. Intelligent tutoring systems": Proceedings of the Fifth international conference, ITS'2000, 314–323.
- Corbett, A.T. and Trask, H. (2000). "Instructional interventions in computer-based tutoring: Differential impact on learning time and accuracy." Proceedings of ACM CHI'2000 Conference on Human Factors in Computing Systems, 97–104.
- Baker R.S., Corbett A.T., Koedinger K.R. (2002) "The Resilience of Overgeneralization of Knowledge about Data Representations." Presented at American Educational Research Association Conference
- Baker R.S., Corbett A.T., Koedinger K.R. (2001) "Toward a Model of Learning Data Representations." Proceedings of the Cognitive Science Society Conference, 45–50.
- Mathan, S., Koedinger, K.R., Corbett, A., & Hyndman, A. (2000). "Effective strategies for bridging gulfs between users and computer systems." In Proceedings of HCI-Aero 2000: International Conference on Human Computer Interaction in Aeronautics. (pp. 197–202). Toulouse, France.
- Corbett, A.T., McLaughlin, M.S. and Scarpinatto, K.C. (2000). "Modeling student knowledge: Cognitive tutors in high school and college. User modeling and user-adapted interaction", 10, 81–108.
