= Human–Computer Interaction Institute at Carnegie Mellon University =

Department of Carnegie Mellon University

Coordinates: 40.443423°N 79.945594°W

- Type: Private
- Established: 1994
- Director: Brad A. Myers
- Faculty: 51
- Location: Pittsburgh, Pennsylvania
- Campus: Urban
- Website: hcii.cmu.edu

The Human–Computer Interaction Institute at Carnegie Mellon University (HCII) is an academic department within the School of Computer Science at Carnegie Mellon University (CMU) in Pittsburgh, Pennsylvania.

It is considered one of the leading centers of human–computer interaction research, and was named one of the top ten most innovative schools in information technology by Computer World in 2008. For the past three decades, the institute has been the predominant publishing force at leading HCI venues, most notably ACM CHI, where it regularly contributes more than 10% of the papers. Research at the institute aims to understand and create technology that harmonizes with and improves human capabilities by integrating aspects of computer science, design, social science, and learning science.

HCII offers Human Computer Interaction (HCI) as an additional major for undergraduates, as well as a master's degree and PhDs in HCI. Students from various academic backgrounds come together from around the world to participate in this program. Students hold undergraduate degrees in psychology, design, and computer science, as well as many others. Students enter the program at various stages in their academic and professional careers. HCII research and educational programs span a full cycle of knowledge creation. The cycle includes research on how people work, play, and communicate within groups, organizations, and social structures. It includes the design, creation, and evaluation of technologies and tools to support human and social activities.

== Academics ==
The institution offers degrees in undergraduate, graduate and doctoral studies.

=== Notable faculty ===
- Randy Pausch was a professor of computer science, human-computer interaction and design. Pausch was also a best-selling author, who became known around the world after he gave "The Last Lecture" speech on September 18, 2007, at Carnegie Mellon. Pausch was instrumental in the development of Alice, a computer teaching tool. He also co-founded Carnegie Mellon's Entertainment Technology Center. Randy Pausch died on July 25, 2008.
- Jodi Forlizzi has been a faculty member with the department since 2000. She specializes interaction design and received a self-defined Ph.D. in human computer interaction and design at Carnegie Mellon University in 2007. She has a background of fine arts with a bachelor's degree in Illustration from University of the Arts. She is a member of the Association for Computing Machinery’s CHI Academy and the Walter Reed Army Medical Center has honored her for excellence in human-robot interaction design research.
- Chris Harrison is a professor at and director of the Future Interfaces Group within the Human–Computer Interaction Institute. He has previously conducted research at AT&T Labs, Microsoft Research, IBM Research and Disney Research. He is known for his pioneering work on scratch input and for developing Skinput and Omnitouch. He is also the CTO and co-founder of Qeexo, a machine learning and interaction technology startup.
- Robert Kraut is a Herbert A. Simon Professor of Human–Computer Interaction. His interests lie with social computing, design, and information technology. In 2016 he received the Carnegie Mellon School of Computer Science – SCS Allen Newell Research Award for his research on "Designing Online Communities."
- Jessica Hammer is an associate professor of learning sciences and the director of the Center for Transformational Play. She has a joint appointment with the Entertainment Technology Center. Hammer researches the psychology of games. She also started the OHLab, along with Amy Ogan and associated students, staff, and colleagues.
- Kenneth Koedinger is a professor of human–computer interaction and psychology. He is well known for his research with intelligent tutoring systems and cognitive tutors. He is a leader in the Learning Sciences and Educational Technology communities with many publications and grants in these areas.
- Vincent Aleven is a professor of human–computer interaction. His research is in the area intelligent tutoring systems and the Learning Sciences. Aleven has been a co-editor of the International Journal for Artificial Intelligence in Education for many years.
- Bruce M. McLaren is a professor of human–computer interaction. His research is in the area educational games, intelligent tutoring systems and the Learning Sciences. He is a former President of the International Artificial Intelligence in Education Society (2017-2019).
- Amy Ogan is an associate professor at the HCII department with interests in emerging technologies for education. She graduated from Carnegie Mellon two times, first as undergraduate with degrees in Spanish, Computer Science, and Human–Computer Interaction, second with a doctoral degree in Human–Computer Interaction. She is a recipient of the Jacobs Foundation Research Fellowship due to her interest in youth education and development.

== Research ==
Some fields in which notable research is currently being done at the HCII are Learning Technologies, Tools and Technology, Human Assistance, Robotics, Arts and Entertainment, and the Entertainment Technology Center (ETC).
