= George Siemens =

Canadian academic

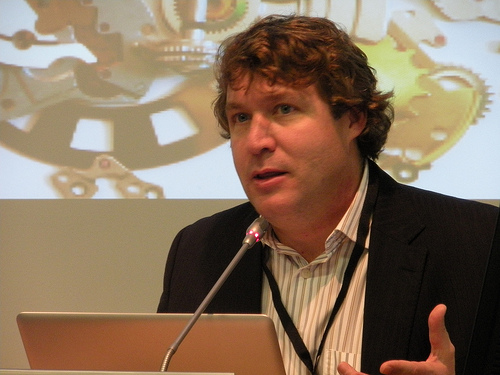
- Siemens at UNESCO conference, 2009
- Born: 1970 (age 55–56)
- Citizenship: Canada
- Education: University of Aberdeen (PhD)
- Scientific career
- Fields: Learning Analytics, massive open online courses, digital education
- Workplaces: University of South Australia; University of Texas Arlington; Athabasca University; University of Manitoba; University of Aberdeen
- Academic advisors: Martin Weller

George Siemens is a Canadian expatriate professor of psychology at the University of Texas at Arlington and professor and director of the Centre for Change and Complexity in Learning at the University of South Australia. He is known for his theory of connectivism, which seeks to understand learning in the digital age. He played a role in the early development of massive online open courses (MOOCs).

== Education ==
Siemens earned his PhD in psychology at the University of Aberdeen in 2011 under the supervision of Frank Rennie, Martin Weller, and Robin Mason. His thesis developed the Sensemaking Wayfinding Information Model (SWIM) to understand individual behavior in social networks.

== Career ==
Siemens joined the faculty and staff of The University of Texas at Arlington in December 2013 as the executive director of the Learning Innovation and Networked Knowledge Research Lab or LINK Lab, which opened in spring of 2014. Siemens commenced his role at the University of South Australia in 2017 as the Director of the Centre for Change and Complexity in Learning. He was formerly a professor at the Center for Distance Education and a researcher and strategist with the Technology Enhanced Knowledge Research Institute (TEKRI) at Athabasca University in Alberta, Canada, where he now serves as an adjunct professor. At Athabasca, he worked with social networked technologies. Prior to Athabasca University, Siemens held a post as the Associate Director of Research and Development with the Learning Technologies Centre at the University of Manitoba.

Siemens has received honorary doctorates from the Universidad de San Martin de Porres (May 2012) and the University of the Fraser Valley (June 2014).

== Massive Open Online Courses (MOOCs) ==
In 2008, Siemens and Stephen Downes designed and taught a massive online open course (MOOC) which was reported as a "landmark in the small but growing push toward 'open teaching'" by the Chronicle of Higher Education.

=== Distinction between cMOOCs and xMOOCs ===
Siemens distinguishes his teaching as connectivist MOOCs, or cMOOCs, as distinguished from institutional MOOC offerings, called xMOOCs, which he says tend to be either instructivist or constructivist. Siemens, together with Baker, Gasevic, and Rose, as well as others like Mitros and Cormier, have been working on bridging the two formats.

== See also ==
- Ryan S. Baker
- Educational data mining
- Dragan Gasevic
- Arthur C. Graesser
- Learning analytics
- Learning sciences
