= Baker Rodrigo Ocumpaugh Monitoring Protocol =

Sampling method for field observations

The Baker Rodrigo Ocumpaugh Monitoring Protocol (BROMP) is a momentary time-sampling method for quantitative field observations such as those used in classroom observation. BROMP was originally developed by Ryan S. Baker to study student engagement in online learning. Afterwards, it was adapted for use in the Philippines by Ma. Mercedes Rodrigo, and to study student emotion. It was systematized by Jaclyn Ocumpaugh in two coding manuals, the first in 2012, and the second in 2015. It was adapted for use in India by Chokanath Hymavathy and Viola Krishnamani. It has also been adapted for use in informal science education settings. Since its development, BROMP has been used in over 50 published scientific articles, by researchers at several universities.

As a momentary time-sampling method for classroom observation, a BROMP observer records students' emotions and behavior according to a pre-defined coding schema. BROMP observers view different students in turn, and take notes using an Android app that records data. This app synchronizes with an internet time server. BROMP observations are carried out by field observers trained and certified through a multi-day training process; according to a 2020 book chapter, there are around 150 BROMP-certified coders in 6 countries. Training methods involve both training in coding affect and engagement, and training in observing students non-obtrusively. It is distinguished from other coding systems for emotion, such as Facial Action Coding System, by its use of holistic coding methods.

BROMP has been used with several coding schemes. According to the 2015 coding manual, the most common coding scheme, the "PSLC" scheme (named after the Pittsburgh Science of Learning Center), consists of:

Behavior	Affect
On task	Boredom
On-task Conversation	Confusion
Off-task	Frustration
Gaming the system	Engaged Concentration
Other	Other

BROMP has been used to collect data for the development of automated detectors of student engagement and affect for commercial systems such as Cognitive Tutor. It has also been used to study and refine commercial products such as Reasoning Mind.

Though originally developed for studying online learning, BROMP is now used for research in traditional classrooms as well. BROMP was used by the Chennai Corporation to study the engagement of children in classes using different teacher practices. It has also been used in informal science education, as part of the instructional design and refinement practices of the Black Rock Forest.

A database of publicly released BROMP data, the BROMPpository, is available for research use.

== See also ==
- Facial Action Coding System
- Affective Computing
