= PSLC =

PSLC may refer to:

- Pittsburgh Science of Learning Center
- Premier Soccer Leagues Canada
- Pseudo SLC
