= Albert Corbett =

Albert Corbett may refer to:

- Albert H. C. Corbett (1887–1983), politician in Manitoba, Canada
- Albert T. Corbett, associate research professor of human-computer interaction at Carnegie Mellon University
