= Source of activation confusion model =

SAC (source of activation confusion) is a computational model of memory encoding and retrieval. It has been developed by Lynne M. Reder at Carnegie Mellon University. It shares many commonalities with ACT-R.

== Structure ==
SAC specifies a memory representation consisting of a network of both semantic (concept) and perceptual nodes (such as font) and associated episodic (context) nodes. Similar to her husband's (John Anderson) model, ACT-R, the node activations are governed by a set of common computational principles such as spreading activation and the strengthening and decay of activation. However, a unique feature of the SAC model are episode nodes, which are newly formed memory traces that binds the concepts involved with the current experiential context. A recent addition to SAC are assumptions governing the probability of forming an association during encoding. These bindings are affected by working memory resources available.

SAC is considered among a class of dual-process models of memory, since recognition involves two processes: a general familiarity process based on the activation of semantic (concept) nodes and a more specific recollection process based on the activation of episodic (context) nodes. This feature has allowed SAC to model a variety of memory phenomena, such as meta-cognitive (rapid) feeling of knowing judgments, remember-know judgments, the word frequency mirror effect, age-related memory loss perceptual fluency, paired associate recognition and cued recall, as well as account for implicit and explicit memory tasks without positing an unconscious memory system for priming.
