= Vincent Aleven =

American computer scientist

Dr. Vincent Aleven
- Education: University of Pittsburgh (PhD); TU Delft
- Scientific career
- Fields: Cognitive psychology, human–computer interaction
- Workplaces: Carnegie Mellon University

Vincent Aleven is a professor of human-computer interaction and director of the undergraduate program at Carnegie Mellon University's Human–Computer Interaction Institute.

In 1998, he co-founded Carnegie Learning, Inc., a Pittsburgh-based company that markets Cognitive Tutor math courses that include intelligent tutoring software. Aleven is also a co-founder of Mathtutor, a free website for middle-school math intelligent tutoring systems.

At Carnegie Mellon University, Aleven's research focuses on intelligent tutoring systems and educational games. His group developed Cognitive Tutor Authoring Tools (CTAT) which allows educators to create intelligent tutoring systems without programming. Aleven's group has also been awarded several best paper awards, including a best paper award at EDM2013, a best student paper award at AIED2009, and the cognition and student learning prize at the Cognitive Science conference 2008. Aleven has mentored many prestigious postdocs and PhD students, including Amy Ogan, Ryan S. Baker, Matthew Easterday, Martina Rau, and Ido Roll.

Aleven was named a top author in Computer Education by Microsoft.

== Education ==
Vincent Aleven attended the Delft University of Technology (TU Delft) from 1980 to 1988, graduating in 1988 with a Master of Science degree in computer science. He then attended the University of Pittsburgh from 1989 to 1997, where he earned a PhD in Intelligent Systems. In 1997, he joined Carnegie Mellon University as a postdoctoral fellow. Since then, he has been conducting research, specializing in artificial intelligence, intelligent educational systems, cognitive modeling, learning and metacognitive skills, and case-based reasoning. He now serves as a professor and director of the undergraduate program at Carnegie Mellon University's Human–Computer Interaction Institute.

== Research ==
Cognitive Tutor

Aleven, along with his colleague Kenneth Koedinger, assisted in creating Cognitive Tutor, an intelligent tutoring software that supports guided tutoring for math courses. His research investigated whether self-explanation through Cognitive Tutor could improve student performance in school more than conventional methods. Aleven and his fellow researchers found that students who explained their problems on practice problems with Cognitive Tutor regularly performed significantly better than those who did not use the software. These results highlight the benefits of self-explanation and learning software that can scale for classroom use to assist all students.

Enhancing MOOCs with ITS

Aleven, along with his colleagues Jonathan Sewall, Ryan Baker, Yuan Wang, and Octav Popescu introduced intelligent tutoring systems(ITS) into massive open online courses (MOOCs) to enhance learning-by-doing and overall student performance. The ITSs support learning-by-doing to assist students by guiding them through complex practice problems and having them explain their work. The researchers also embedded their Cognitive Tutor Authoring Tools(CTAT), a toolkit to create intelligent computer tutors, into MOOCs. Their research demonstrated the technical feasibility of embedding CTAT or similar ITSs into MOOCs. This works also shows the effectiveness of learning-by-doing through one-to-one coaching in online courses combined with ITS.

=== Adaptivity Grids and Learning Technology ===
In 2016, Aleven, along with his colleagues McLaughlin, Glenn, and Koedinger, examined how the effectiveness of digital tutors can be increased by adapting to the unique differences between learners, as well as to the similarities between them, such as common hurdles to solving a problem. In this paper, Aleven and colleagues introduce a tool called the Adaptivity Grid, which organizes research results in adaptivity, making it easier for developers to decide which forms of adaptivity would be best to build into their tutoring systems.

"The Adaptivity Grid shows three columns, which capture three ways in which digital tutoring systems can be adaptive to learners, namely, in their design loop, task loop, and step loop. In the design loop, the system designers use data about the targeted learners in the given task domain to create a new version of the system that is better adapted to these learners. In the task loop, the digital tutor picks problems for the student. In the step loop, the digital tutor provides assistance during steps within the problem. The Adaptivity Grid's horizontal rows show what a digital tutor can adapt to, related to the learner's traits, states, or actions."

== See also ==
- Kenneth Koedinger
- Bruce McLaren
- Ryan Baker
- Nikol Rummel
- Kevin Ashley
