= Jodi Forlizzi =

American interaction designer

Jodi L. Forlizzi
- Education: Philadelphia College of Art, Carnegie Mellon University
- Employer(s): Carnegie Mellon University, AFL-CIO Tech Institute
- Awards: ACM CHI Lifetime Research Award and CHI Academy Member, Excellence in Design Research from the Walter Reed Army Medical Center, Alan Newell Award for Research Excellence
- Website: Jodi Forlizzi: Interaction design, service design, and design research

Jodi L. Forlizzi is The Herbert A. Simon Professor, and an interaction designer and researcher, at the Human-Computer Interaction Institute at Carnegie Mellon University. Jodi has advocated for design research in all forms, mentoring peers, colleagues, and students in its structure and execution, and today it is an important part of the HCI community. Jodi studies the ethical impacts of human interaction with AI systems in front-line service industries including healthcare and hospitality. She studies the potential for AI to facilitate purposeful employment for people with disabilities. She also develops methods and tools to ensure that product developers can mitigate ethical harms and bias during product development. Jodi is an ACM SIGCHI Fellow and recently received its Lifetime Research Award. She recently testified to the US Senate in one an AI Innovation Briefing and is a central advisor to the AFL-CIO Tech Institute and the NIST Industrial Advisory Committee regarding technology research.

== Education ==
Forlizzi obtained her Bachelor of Fine Arts in Illustration from the Philadelphia College of Art. She obtained her master's degree in Interaction Design from Carnegie Mellon University in 1997 and her Ph.D. in Design in Human-Computer Interaction in 2007 also from Carnegie Mellon University.

== Career ==
Forlizzi began working as an information designer for the University of Pennsylvania School of Engineering and Applied Science in 1985, while still an undergraduate. to 1995. She then did design research for the Novum Design Center at Carnegie Mellon University (1995–97). She was appointed an assistant professor of the HCI Institute in early 2000, becoming a full professor in 2014. Between 2007 and 2010, she was the A. Nico Habermann Junior Faculty Chair in Computer Science.

She has worked as an innovator and project manager of E-Lab LLC in Chicago. She has also done consulting work for major companies, including General Motors, Disney Research, Willow Garage, BodyMedia, University of Pennsylvania School of Engineering, University of Pennsylvania Law School, University of Pennsylvania Linguistic Data Consortium, Luton Corporation, and Nurseweek.

Forlizzi is a co-founder of Pratter.us since 2014, a health care startup aimed at enabling employees to search and save money on medical care by zip code before the time of service.

== Research ==
=== Big Data and Design ===
Forlizzi works on how the metadata from smartphones and users’ online behaviors can be used for lifelogging and help people to understand their identity and legacy. She and her colleague conducted a research on understanding how systems may play a role in storing people’s legacy and digital record. She also studied how people worldwide perceive virtual possessions, such as SMS and email archives or Google search history.

=== Service Design ===
Service design is also one of Forlizzi’s research interests. She has done studies on service recovery, adaptive service design, and how to personalize service delivery to help people meet their goals in using a service. Some of her contributions for service design are promoting service design as a practice for interaction design and reducing robot service breakdowns.

=== Human-Robot Interaction ===
Forlizzi’s work in human-robot interaction includes designing robots to assist elders, human-robot interactions for tangible robots and medical robots. In her study about robot presence and human honesty, she and her colleagues found that there is no difference in perceived authority of human and robot, but people felt less guilty after cheating in the presence of a robot. She also studied the social impact of home-cleaning robots.

=== Designing Educational Games ===
For educational games, Forlizzi was involved in Playtesting, a three-stage workshop for getting people to play a game to see if it produces the experience for which it was designed. The first workshop used playtesting to explore a design space. The second workshop refines an existing design, and the last workshop focuses on persuading stakeholders. Between 2014 and 2017, she and Bruce M. McLaren designed, developed and experimented with an educational game called Decimal Point.

== Awards ==
Her awards include the Carnegie Mellon School of Design Merit Award (1996 and 1997), Design and Emotion Slow Glow Award for Excellence in Design Research (2010), Excellence Award from the Walter Reed Army Medical Center on Robotics in Rehabilitation (2011) and the Alan Newell Award for Research Excellence from Carnegie Mellon University (2013). In 2014, she was inducted into the ACM SIGCHI Academy.
