= Bruce M. McLaren =

American researcher, academic and author (born 1959)

Bruce Martin McLaren
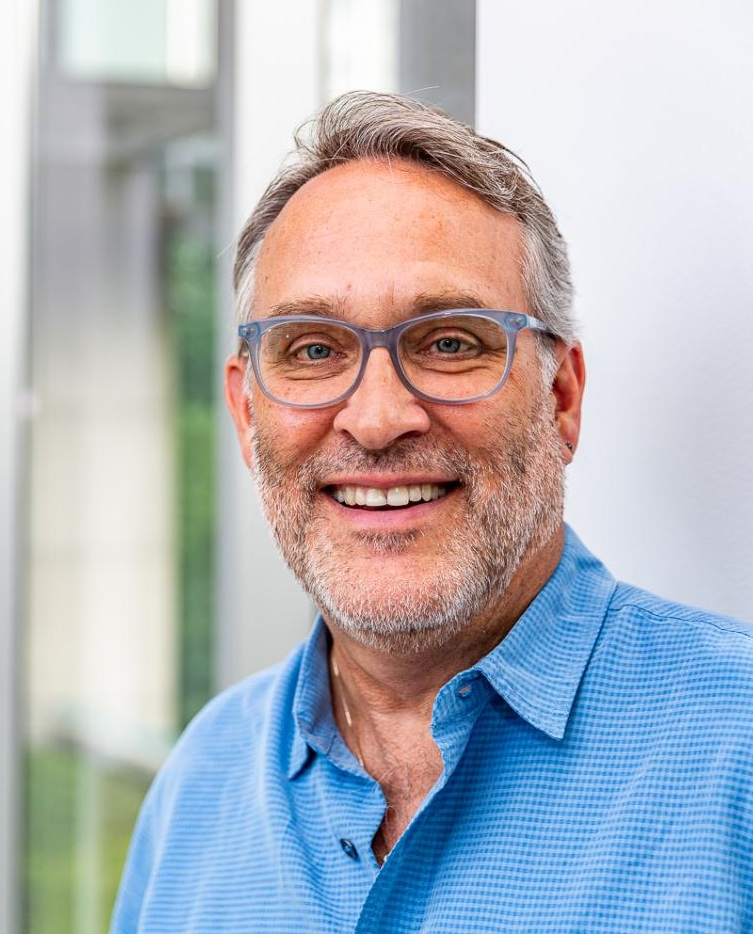
- Born: October 28, 1959 (age 66); Pittsburgh, Pennsylvania, United States
- Occupations: researcher, scientist and author
- Children: 2

Academic background
- Education: B.S., Computer Science; M.S., in Computer Science; M.S., Intelligent Systems; Ph.D., Intelligent Systems
- Alma mater: Millersville University of Pennsylvania; University of Pittsburgh
- Doctoral advisor: Prof. Kevin D. Ashley

Academic work
- Institutions: Carnegie Mellon University; German Research Center for Artificial Intelligence; Saarland University
- Main interests: Artificial Intelligence, Educational Technology, Digital Learning Games, and Machine Ethics
- Website: http://www.cs.cmu.edu/~bmclaren/

Bruce Martin McLaren (born 1959 in Pittsburgh, Pennsylvania) is an American researcher and scientist in the fields of educational technology and artificial intelligence. He is a professor at Carnegie Mellon University's Human–Computer Interaction Institute and directs the McLearn Lab. McLaren is known for his work on intelligent tutoring systems, educational games, collaborative learning, and machine ethics. From 2017 to 2019, he was president of the International Artificial Intelligence in Education Society.

== Early life and education ==
McLaren was born in Pittsburgh, Pennsylvania, in 1959. He earned a B.S. in computer science (cum laude) from Millersville University of Pennsylvania in 1981, followed by an M.S. in computer science from the University of Pittsburgh in 1984. He later completed a second M.S. in intelligent systems (1994) and a Ph.D. in intelligent systems (1999) at Pittsburgh. His doctoral dissertation, Assessing the Relevance of Cases and Principles Using Operationalization Techniques, was supervised by Kevin Ashley. Findings from his doctoral research were published in the Artificial Intelligence Journal. and helped to found the field of Machine Ethics.

== Career ==
McLaren began his career in industry as a software engineer at General Electric and later worked for the Carnegie Group in Europe and the United States, focusing on expert systems. After earning his Ph.D., he held research and development leadership roles at OpenWebs Corporation before joining Carnegie Mellon University (CMU) in 2002 as a systems scientist. He was promoted to associate research professor in 2015 and to full professor in 2024.

Between 2006 and 2010, McLaren was a visiting senior researcher at the German Research Center for Artificial Intelligence in Saarbrücken, where he contributed to projects on collaborative learning and argumentation technologies, including ARGUNAUT and LASAD.

Within the International Artificial Intelligence in Education Society, McLaren was elected to the executive committee in 2011 and was president from 2017 to 2019. During his presidency, the society shifted to annual conferences and introduced new recognition awards. He was re-elected to the Executive Committee of the society in 2021.

== Research ==
McLaren’s research spans learning with digital learning games, learning to argue and reason through computer-mediated collaborative learning; and learning with interactive worked and erroneous examples; and machine ethics. He has authored or co-authored more than 200 academic publications and holds five patents.

=== Digital learning games ===
McLaren and Jodi Forlizzi co-developed Decimal Point, a digital game for teaching decimals. Controlled studies demonstrated that the game produced higher learning gains and engagement compared to conventional computer-based methods. His research group has since examined topics such as gender differences in game-based learning, student agency, and data mining of educational game interactions. In 2023, McLaren and Huy Nguyen co-authored a chapter on Artificial Intelligence in digital learning games for the Handbook on AI in Education.

=== Learning to argue through computer-mediated collaborative learning ===
Since 2005, McLaren has investigated how technology can support collaborative and argument-based learning. His work includes developing intelligent tutoring systems for dyad collaboration in mathematics and science, and creating automated techniques for analyzing online arguments using machine learning and natural language processing. He co-led the LASAD project with Niels Pinkwart, which provided teachers with tools to guide classroom debates and discussions.

=== Worked and erroneous examples ===
McLaren has studied the role of worked and erroneous examples in learning, especially as supported by technology. His experiments have shown that alternating worked examples with problem solving can improve efficiency, while exposure to erroneous examples can enhance long-term learning in mathematics and science domains.

=== Machine ethics ===
As part of his doctoral work, McLaren developed computational models for ethical reasoning using case-based approaches. His publications in this area are among the early contributions to the field of Machine Ethics, and he is one of its most cited researchers. Media outlets such as CNN have cited his views on the ethical implications of AI and robotics.

== Personal life ==
McLaren is the son of Thomas James McLaren, a Presbyterian minister, and Shirley Martin McLaren, a high school English teacher. He was married to Gabriele Huber from 1990 to 2013. An avid outdoorsman, he completed a thru-hike of the Appalachian Trail in 1989.

== Selected papers ==
- Ashley, K.D. & McLaren, B.M. (1995). Reasoning with reasons in case-based comparisons. Proceedings of the First International Conference on Case-Based Reasoning, 133–144.
- McLaren, B.M. (2003). Extensionally defining principles and cases in ethics: An AI model. Artificial Intelligence, 150, 145–181.
- McLaren, B.M. (2024). Decimal Point: A decade of learning science findings with a digital learning game. In: Ilic, P., Casebourne, I., Wegerif, R. (eds) Artificial Intelligence in Education: The Intersection of Technology and Pedagogy. Intelligent Systems Reference Library, vol 261. Springer, Cham. https://doi.org/10.1007/978-3-031-71232-6_9.
- McLaren, B.M. (2006). Computational models of ethical reasoning: Challenges, initial steps, and future directions. IEEE Intelligent Systems, Published by the IEEE Computer Society. July/August 2006. 29-37.
- McLaren, B.M., Adams, D.M., & Mayer, R.E. (2015). Delayed learning effects with erroneous examples. International Journal of Artificial Intelligence in Education, 25(4), 520–542.
- McLaren, B.M., Richey, J.E., Nguyen, H., and Hou, X. (2022). How instructional context can impact learning with educational technology: Lessons from a study with a digital learning game. Computers & Education, 178. https://doi.org/10.1016/j.compedu.2021.104366.
- McLaren, B.M. & Nguyen, H.A. (2023). Digital learning games in Artificial Intelligence in Education (AIED): A review. In B. du Boulay, A. Mitrovic, & K. Yacef (Eds.), Handbook of Artificial Intelligence in Education. Chapter 20. doi: https://doi.org/10.4337/9781800375413.00032.
- McLaren, B.M., Scheuer, O., & Mikšátko, J. (2010). Supporting collaborative learning and e-Discussions using artificial intelligence techniques. International Journal of Artificial Intelligence in Education (IJAIED) 20(1), 1–46.

== See also ==
- Learning sciences
- Educational games
- Vincent Aleven, professor at Carnegie Mellon University's Human–Computer Interaction Institute
- Ryan S. Baker, professor of education and computer science, director of the Penn Center for Learning Analytics
- Kenneth Koedinger, professor of human–computer interaction and psychology at Carnegie Mellon University
