= Bayesian cognitive science =

Bayesian cognitive science, also known as computational cognitive science, is an approach to cognitive science concerned with the rational analysis of cognition through the use of Bayesian inference and cognitive modeling. The term "computational" refers to the computational level of analysis as put forth by David Marr.

This work often consists of testing the hypothesis that cognitive systems behave like rational Bayesian agents in particular types of tasks. Past work has applied this idea to categorization, language, motor control, sequence learning, reinforcement learning and theory of mind.

At other times, Bayesian rationality is assumed, and the goal is to infer the knowledge that agents have, and the mental representations that they use.

It is important to contrast this with the ordinary use of Bayesian inference in cognitive science, which is independent of rational modeling (see e.g. Michael Lee's work).

== See also ==
- Active inference
- Bayesian approaches to brain function
- Bayesian programming
- Rational analysis
