= Reasoning Mind =

Non-profit organizations based in Houston

- Founded: 2000
- Type: 501(c)(3) public charity
- Purpose: Improving K-12 math education
- Location: Houston, Texas
- Employees: 150+

Reasoning Mind is a non-profit organization that develops computer-based math curricula and works with schools to implement them in classrooms. In addition, Reasoning Mind provides professional development to teachers using the program. The organization works closely with partner schools to help them achieve a successful implementation. Reasoning Mind uses Instruction Modeling and the Baker Rodrigo Ocumpaugh Monitoring Protocol as core components of its research and development process.

In the 2014–2015 school year, over 100,000 students in grades 2-6 are enrolled in Reasoning Mind's courses. Most of the students are in Texas, but many students in other states (such as West Virginia, California, New York, and Oklahoma) also participate in the program.

The program has been endorsed by the Philanthropy Roundtable, and Reasoning Mind's teacher professional development was praised by the National Council on Teacher Quality. In December 2008, the Academy of Medicine, Engineering and Science of Texas included Reasoning Mind in a list of ten "programs that get an A+."

Reasoning Mind is primarily funded by philanthropy. Major supporters include the Bill & Melinda Gates Foundation, the Houston Endowment, the Michael and Susan Dell Foundation, and the ExxonMobil Foundation. The program is also funded by a grant from the Texas Education Agency.

In May 2015, Reasoning Mind was announced as the winner of Deloitte's RightStep Innovation Prize.

In July 2018, Reasoning Mind was acquired by Imagine Learning.

== See also ==
- Houston A+ Challenge
