= Neil Heffernan =

American computer scientist

Dr. Neil Heffernan
- Born: June 1970 (age 56)
- Citizenship: USA
- Education: Carnegie Mellon University (PhD)
- Scientific career
- Fields: Computer Science, Learning Sciences
- Workplaces: Worcester Polytechnic Institute

Neil T. Heffernan (born June 1970 in Worcester, Massachusetts) is a professor of computer science at Worcester Polytechnic Institute. He is known for his role in the development of the ASSISTments online learning tool and app, which assists students with homework and classwork while helping teachers assess where to focus instructional time in mathematics, and is used by over 50,000 students a year in the US. His work gained prominence when a New York Times Magazine story by Annie Murphy Paul featured ASSISTments and Heffernan's research with the tool.

== Early life and education ==
Heffernan obtained a bachelor's degree in History and Computer Science at Amherst College, and a doctorate in Computer Science from Carnegie Mellon University. His doctoral advisers were Kenneth Koedinger and John Robert Anderson.

== Career ==
Following his doctoral studies, Heffernan worked as Assistant Professor and then Associate Professor at Worcester Polytechnic Institute, establishing the Learning Sciences research group in the Computer Science Department at WPI and the Learning Sciences and Technology graduate program at WPI.

== See also ==
- Learning Sciences
- Kenneth Koedinger
- John Robert Anderson
