= Analytics in higher education =

Academic analytics is defined as the process of evaluating and analyzing organizational data received from university systems for reporting and decision making reasons (Campbell, & Oblinger, 2007). Academic analytics will help student and faculty to track their career and professional paths. According to Campbell & Oblinger (2007), accrediting agencies, governments, parents and students are all calling for the adoption of new modern and efficient ways of improving and monitoring student success. This has ushered the higher education system into an era characterized by increased scrutiny from the various stakeholders. For instance, the Bradley review acknowledges that benchmarking activities such as student engagement serve as indicators for gauging the institution's quality (Commonwealth Government of Australia, 2008).

Increased competition, accreditation, assessment and regulation are the major factors encouraging the adoption of analytics in higher education. Although institutions of higher learning gather much vital data that can significantly aid in solving problems like attrition and retention, the collected data is not being analysed adequately and hence translated into useful data (Goldstein, 2005).

Subsequently, higher education leadership are forced to make critical and vital decisions based on inadequate information that could be achieved by properly utilising and analysing the available data (Norris, Leonard, & strategic Initiatives Inc., 2008). This gives rise to strategic problems. This setback also depicts itself at the tactical level. Learning and teaching at institutions of higher education if often a diverse and complex experience. Each and every teacher, student or course is quite different.

However, LMS is tasked with taking care of them all. LMS is at the centre of academic analytics. It records each and every student and staff's information and results in a click within the system. When this crucial information is added, compared and contrasted with different enterprise information systems provides the institution with a vast array of useful information that can be harvested to gain a competitive edge (Dawson & McWilliam, 2008; Goldstein, 2005; Heathcoate & Dawson, 2005).

In order to retrieve meaningful information from institution sources i.e. LMS, the information has to be correctly interpreted against a basis of educational efficiency, and this action requires analysis from people with learning and teaching skills. Therefore, a collaborative approach is required from both the people guarding the data and those who will interpret it, otherwise the data will remain to be a total waste (Baepler & Murdoch, 2010). Decision making at its most basic level is based on presumption or intuition (a person can make conclusions and decisions based on experience without having to do data analysis) (Siemens & Long, 2011). However, a lot of decisions made at institutions of higher learning are too vital to be based on anecdote, presumption or intuition since significant decisions need to be backed by data and facts.

== Background ==
Analytics, which is often termed “business intelligence”, has come out as new software and hardware that enables businesses to gather and analyse large amounts of information or data. The analytics process is made up of gathering, analysing, data manipulation and employing the results to answer critical questions such as ‘why’. Analytics was first applied in the admissions department in higher education institutions. The institutions normally used some formulas to choose students from a large pool of applicants. These formulas drew their information from high school transcripts and standardized test scores.

In today's world, analytics is commonly used in administrative units such as fund raising and admissions. The use and application of academic analytics is meant to grow due to the ever-increasing concerns about student success and accountability. Academic analytics primarily marries complex and vast data with predictive modelling and statistical techniques to better decision making. Current academic analytics initiatives are bent to use data to predict students experiencing difficulty (Arnold, & Pistilli, 2012, April). This allows advisors and faculty members to intervene by tailoring procedures which will meet the student's learning needs (Arnold, 2010). As such, academic analytics possesses the ability to improve learning, student success and teaching. Analytics has become a valuable tool for institutions because of its ability to predict, model and improve decision making.

== Analytic Steps ==
Analysis is composed of five basic steps: capture, report, predict, act and refine.

Capture: All analytic efforts are centred on data. Consequently, academic analytics can be rooted in data from various sources such as a CMS, and financial systems (Campbell, Finnegan, & Collins, 2006). Additionally, the data comes in various different formats for example spread sheets. Also, data can be got from the institution's external environment. To capture data, academic analytics needs to determine the type of available data, methods of harnessing it and the formats it is in.

Report: After the data has been captured and stored in a central location, analysts will examine the data, perform queries, identify patterns, trends and exceptions depicted by the data. The standard deviation and mean (descriptive statistics) are mostly generated.

Predict: After analysing the warehoused data through the use of statistics, a predictive model is developed. These models vary depending on the question nature and type of data. To develop a probability, these models employ statistical regression concepts and techniques. Predictions are made after the use of statistical algorithms.

Act: The major goal and aim of analytics is to enable the institution to take actions based on the probabilities and predictions made. These actions might vary from invention to information. The interventions to address problems might be in the form of a personal email, phone call or an automated contact from faculty advisors about study resources and skills, such as office hours or help sessions. Undoubtedly, institutions have to come up with appropriate mechanisms for impact measurement; such as did the students actually respond or attend the help sessions when invited.

Refine: Academic analytics should also be made up of a process aimed at self-improvement. Statistics processes should be continually updated since the measurement of project impacts is not a one-time static effort but rather a continual effort. For instance, admission analytics should be updated or revised yearly.

=== Comprehending Involved Stakeholders ===
Analytics affects executive officers, students, faculty members, IT staff and student affairs staff. Whereas students will be keen to know academic analytics will affect their grades, faculty members will be interested in finding out how the information and data can be appropriated for other purposes (Pistilli, Arnold & Bethune, 2012). Moreover, the institution staff will be focussed on finding how the analysis will enable them to effectively accomplish their jobs while the institution president will be focussed on freshman retention and increase in graduation rates.

== Criticisms ==
Analytics have been criticised for various reasons such as profiling. Their main use is to profile students into successful and unsuccessful categories. However, some individuals argue that profiling of students tends to bias people's behaviours and expectations (Ferguson, 2012). Additionally, there is no clear guidelines on which profiling issues should be prohibited or allowed in institutions of higher learning.
