= Carnegie Learning =

Education software publisher

Coordinates: 40°26′21.1″N 79°59′50.1″W

Carnegie Learning, Inc.
- Industry: Online education, SaaS, publishing
- Founded: 1998
- Founder: William S. Hadley, Steven Ritter, John R. Anderson, Kenneth Koedinger, co-founders
- Headquarters: Koppers Tower, Pittsburgh, Pennsylvania, United States
- Key people: Barry Malkin, CEO
- Products: MATHia, Software, Textbooks
- Owner: CIP Capital

Carnegie Learning, Inc. is an artificial intelligence-driven K-12 education provider of services for math, literacy and ELA, world languages, and applied sciences, as well as high-dosage tutoring and professional learning.

The Carnegie Learning headquarters is located in the Koppers Tower in Pittsburgh, Pennsylvania.

== History ==
The company was founded on pioneering research in artificial intelligence (AI) and cognitive science by Dr. Steven Ritter, William S. Hadley, John R. Anderson, and Kenneth Koedinger, researchers in cognitive science, computer science, and education, in 1998 as a research project at Carnegie Mellon University in Pittsburgh, Pennsylvania.

Carnegie Learning's initial focus was on developing intelligent tutoring systems for mathematics education, leveraging cognitive science and computer technology to provide personalized and adaptive learning experiences for students. Their work was influenced by research on cognitive psychology, AI and education.

Carnegie Learning was acquired by private equity firm CIP Capital in 2018, and is backed by over $90 million in funding from organizations that include the Bill & Melinda Gates Foundation and the Walton Family Foundation.

Over time, Carnegie Learning expanded its offerings to provide comprehensive math curricula for schools, blending traditional classroom instruction with technology-based resources and assessments. Its K-12 education portfolio expanded beyond math to include ELA, world languages, professional learning, and tutoring.

In October 2024, Carnegie Learning opened a Canadian headquarters in downtown St. John's, Newfoundland.

== Acquisitions ==
On August 2, 2011, The Apollo Group announced its intent to acquire Carnegie Learning for $75 million. The Apollo Group also acquired related technology from Carnegie Mellon University for $21.5 million paid over a period of ten years. The transaction was completed in September 2011.

On November 06, 2015, the Apollo Education Group, Inc., signed an agreement for a group of Chicago-based investors with deep K-12 education experience to acquire Carnegie Learning, Inc.

New Mountain Learning, a publishing company owned by CIP, was merged into Carnegie Learning, following the latter's 2018 acquisition. New Mountain imprints include EMC, Paradigm, and JIST. In 2020, Kendall Hunt Publishing Company acquired Paradigm and JIST.

The company acquired MUSE Virtual, a K-12 online learning platform founded by Suzy Amis Cameron and James Cameron, in November 2022.

== Products ==
Carnegie Learning's MATHia software was created by researchers from Carnegie Mellon University.

In 2020, Carnegie Learning added Fast ForWord, a reading and language software, to its portfolio.

Other products include:

- Middle School and High School Math Solutions
- ClearMath Elementary
- MATHia Adventure
- MATHstream
- Mirrors & Windows (ELA)
- Clearfluency (ELA)
- Bookshop Phonics (ELA)
- ¡Qué chévere! (Spanish)
- En voz alta: Español para hispanohablantes (Spanish for Spanish speakers)
- T’es branché? (French), Deutsch So Aktuell (German)
- Zhēn Bàng! (Chinese)
- Amici d'Italia (Italian)
- Symtalk (Spanish and French)
- Exploring (Spanish, French, German, Chinese, and Italian)
- World Language Immersion (Spanish, French, and German)
