= Lynne M. Reder =

American psychologist

- Born: December 28, 1950 (age 75)
- Citizenship: United States
- Education: Stanford University, University of Michigan
- Known for: Studies of human memory Source of activation confusion model
- Scientific career
- Fields: Cognitive psychology
- Workplaces: Carnegie Mellon University
- Thesis: The Role Of Elaborations In The Processing Of Prose (1976)
- Doctoral advisor: Robert A. Bjork, James Greeno
- Other academic advisors: John R. Anderson
- Doctoral students: Vencislav Popov, Xiaonan Liu, Rachel Diana

Lynne Reder is an American psychologist whose research contributed to our understanding of human memory.

== Career ==
Her contributions to psychological science and experimental psychology have been recognized through multiple honors and elected positions:

- 1999: Elected Fellow, American Psychological Association (APA), Division 3
- 2001: Elected Fellow, American Association for Advancement of Science (AAAS)
- 2005: Elected Fellow, Association for Psychological Science (APS)
- 2007: Elected to the Society of Experimental Psychologists
- 2010: Elected to the Memory Disorders Research Society (MDRS)
- 2011 - 2016: Elected to the Governing Board of The Psychonomic Society
- 2013 - 2017: Elected Member at Large, Section J, American Association for the Advancement of Science (AAAS)

== Selected research and publications ==
=== Role of Elaborations and Summaries in Memory Retention ===
Reder's early work explored the effects of elaborations and summaries on learning. She found that people often learned more from summaries than original texts and that self-generated elaborations improve retention better than elaborations provided by the author

- Reder, Lynne M (1979-04-01). "The role of elaborations in memory for prose". Cognitive Psychology. 11 (2): 221–234. doi:10.1016/0010-0285(79)90010-0. ISSN 0010-0285.
- Reder, Lynne M. (1980). "The Role of Elaboration in the Comprehension and Retention of Prose: A Critical Review". Review of Educational Research. 50 (1): 5–53. doi:10.3102/00346543050001005. ISSN 0034-6543. JSTOR 1170029.

=== Strategy Selection and Question Answering ===
Reder showed that people do not default to direct retrieval when attempting to answer a question but rather dynamically choose strategies based on intrinsic question features (e.g., feeling of knowing, partial matching) and base rates of success.

- Reder, Lynne M. (1982). "Plausibility judgments versus fact retrieval: Alternative strategies for sentence verification". Psychological Review. 89 (3): 250–280. doi:10.1037/0033-295X.89.3.250.
- Reder, Lynne M (1987-01-01). "Strategy selection in question answering". Cognitive Psychology. 19 (1): 90–138. doi:10.1016/0010-0285(87)90005-3. ISSN 0010-0285.

=== Source of Activation Confusion (SAC) Model of Memory ===
Reder developed the Source of Activation Confusion (SAC) model, which uses activation-based principles to explain diverse phenomena, including the misinformation effect, contextual fan effects, recognition memory (Remember/Know judgments), and age-related memory differences.Reder's Source of Activation Confusion (SAC) model has been discussed in reviews of computational and dual-process theories of recognition memory and in treatments of familiarity and metacognition.

- Ayers, Michael S.; Reder, Lynne M. (1998-03-01). "A theoretical review of the misinformation effect: Predictions from an activation-based memory model". Psychonomic Bulletin & Review. 5 (1): 1–21. doi:10.3758/BF03209454. ISSN 1531-5320.
- Reder, Lynne M.; Nhouyvanisvong, Adisack; Schunn, Christian D.; Ayers, Michael S.; Angstadt, Paige; Hiraki, Kazuo (2000). "A mechanistic account of the mirror effect for word frequency: A computational model of remember–know judgments in a continuous recognition paradigm". Journal of Experimental Psychology: Learning, Memory, and Cognition. 26 (2): 294–320. doi:10.1037/0278-7393.26.2.294. ISSN 1939-1285. PMID 10764098. Archived from the original on 2024-04-18.

=== Role of Hippocampus in Memory ===
Reder showed that both implicit and explicit memory tasks can rely on the hippocampus, depending on whether the task requires the formation of new associations.

- Reder, Lynne M.; Park, Heekyeong; Kieffaber, Paul D. (2009). "Memory systems do not divide on consciousness: Reinterpreting memory in terms of activation and binding". Psychological Bulletin. 135 (1): 23–49. doi:10.1037/a0013974. ISSN 1939-1455. PMC 2747326. PMID 19210052.
- Park, Heekyeong; Quinlan, Joseph; Thornton, Edward; Reder, Lynne M. (2004-12-21). "The effect of midazolam on visual search: Implications for understanding amnesia". Proceedings of the National Academy of Sciences. 101 (51): 17879–17883. Bibcode:2004PNAS..10117879P. doi:10.1073/pnas.0408075101. PMC 535584. PMID 15596721.

=== Working Memory and Cognitive Resources ===
Reder’s contributions to working memory include the development of the Modified Digit Span (MODS) task, which predicts cognitive performance across domains. She expanded her SAC model to incorporate the role of working memory in knowledge construction, emphasizing resource limitations in memory processes showing that resources are consumed/depleted as an inverse function of chunk familiarity and rate of replenishment depends on the rate of input and familiarity of the information to be processed.

- Reder, Lynne M.; Liu, Xiaonan L.; Keinath, Alexander; Popov, Vencislav (2016-02-01). "Building knowledge requires bricks, not sand: The critical role of familiar constituents in learning". Psychonomic Bulletin & Review. 23 (1): 271–277. doi:10.3758/s13423-015-0889-1. ISSN 1531-5320. PMID 26139355.
- Popov, Vencislav; Reder, Lynne M. (2021). "Frequency effects on memory: A resource-limited theory". Psychological Review. 127 (1): 1–46. doi:10.1037/rev0000161. ISSN 1939-1471. PMID 31524424.
