= Dragan Gašević =

Computer scientist and learning analytics researcher

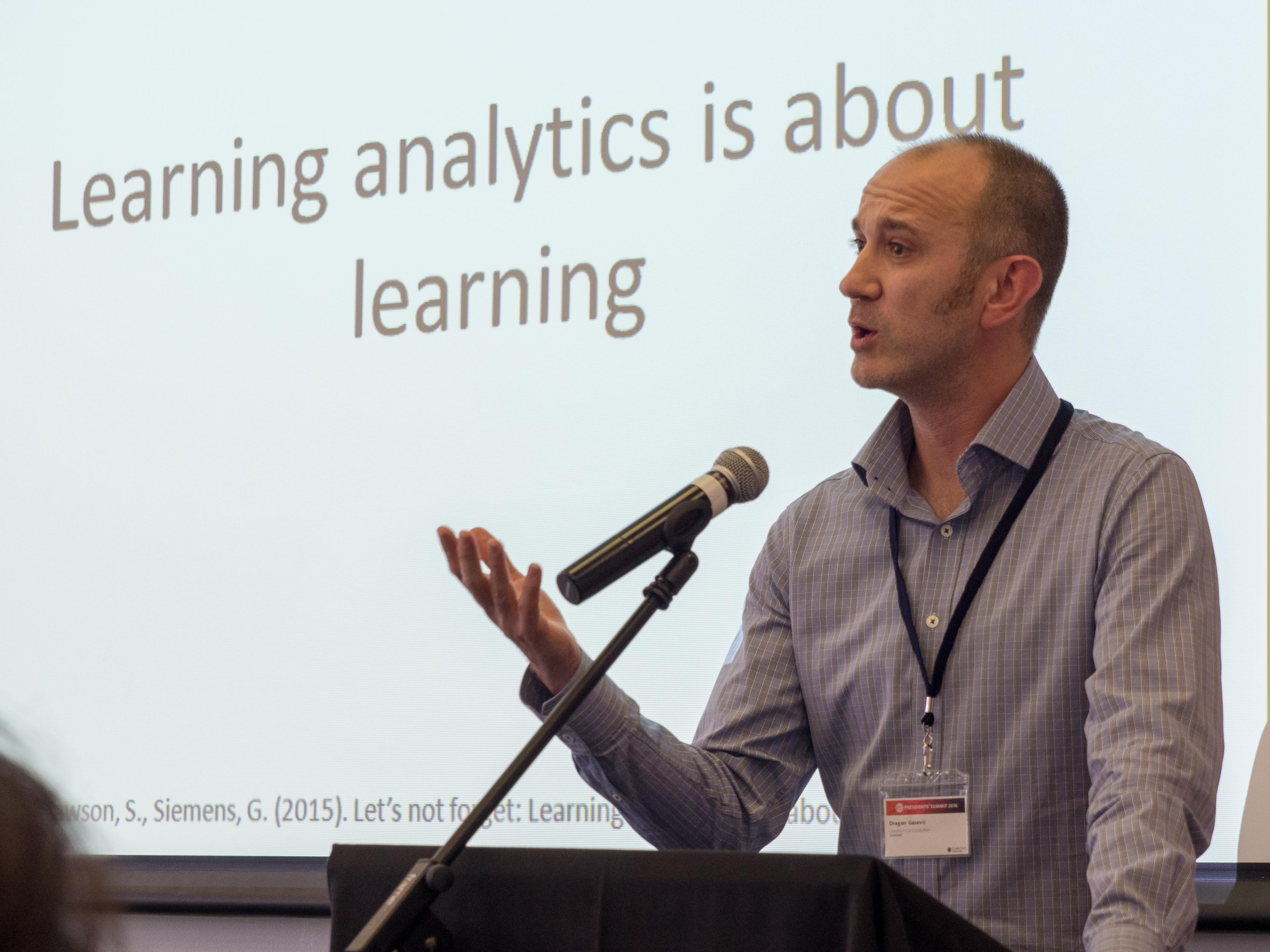
- Gasevic ICDE Presidents' Summit
- Education: University of Belgrade (PhD)
- Scientific career
- Fields: Learning analytics
- Workplaces: Monash University, University of Edinburgh, Athabasca University, Simon Fraser University
- Academic advisors: Vladan Devedžić

Dragan Gašević is Professor of Learning Analytics at Monash University. He is a researcher in learning analytics and co-developed several software systems such as P3, rBPMN Editor, LOCO-Analyst, OnTask, OVAL, and ProSolo.

== Early life and education ==
Dragan Gašević (born 5 July 1976) is a Serbian-Canadian computer scientist and Distinguished Professor of Learning Analytics at Monash University in Melbourne, Australia. He is the Director of the Centre for Learning Analytics (CoLAM) at Monash University's Faculty of Information Technology. His research focuses on learning analytics, artificial intelligence in education, and self-regulated learning. 16

== Career ==
Gašević was a postdoctoral fellow at Simon Fraser University in Canada. From 2007 to 2015, he was a Professor at Athabasca University in Canada, where he held a Canada Research Chair in Semantic and Learning Technologies. From 2015 to 2018, he was a Professor and Chair in Learning Analytics and Informatics at the University of Edinburgh, where he held the Sir Tim O'Shea Chair.

In 2018, he joined Monash University as Professor of Learning Analytics and Director of the Centre for Learning Analytics.‌

== Awards and honors ==
- 2022: ACM Distinguished Member
- Lifetime Member Award (2022): Society for Learning Analytics Research (SoLAR)‌
- ACM Distinguished Member (2022): Association for Computing Machinery
- National Field Leader (2019–2025): The Australian's Research Magazine

== Selected Publications ==
- Gašević, D., Tsai, Y.-S., & Drachsler, H. (2021). Learning analytics in higher education – Stakeholders, strategy and scale. The Internet and Higher Education, 52, 100833.‌
- Yan, L., Greiff, S., Teuber, Z., & Gašević, D. (2024). Promise and challenges of generative AI for human learning. Nature Human Behaviour, 8, 1839–1850.
- Gašević, D., Joksimović, S., Eagan, B. R., & Shaffer, D. W. (2019). SENS: Network analytics to combine social and cognitive perspectives of collaborative learning. Computers in Human Behavior, 92, 562–577.
