= Kenneth Koedinger =

American psychologist

Dr. Kenneth Koedinger
- Citizenship: USA
- Education: University of Wisconsin-Madison, Carnegie Mellon University (PhD)
- Scientific career
- Fields: Cognitive psychology, Human-Computer Interaction
- Workplaces: Carnegie Mellon University

Kenneth R. Koedinger (born 1962) is an American cognitive scientist and computer scientist who is the Hillman University Professor of Computer Science at Carnegie Mellon University, with appointments in the Human-Computer Interaction Institute and Department of Psychology. His research focuses on cognitive science, learning science, educational technology, intelligent tutoring systems, educational data mining, and human-centered artificial intelligence.

Koedinger's research has focused on using computational models of human cognition to understand learning and to design educational technologies. He has contributed to the development of intelligent tutoring systems, including the Cognitive Tutor family of systems, and to the use of educational data to study student learning in authentic classroom settings.

In 2025, Carnegie Mellon selected Koedinger as a University Professor, a title awarded by the university to internationally recognized faculty members for contributions to education, research, or artistic creativity. In 2026, he received the Lifetime Achievement Award from the International Artificial Intelligence in Education Society for his contributions to learning sciences, educational technology, and artificial intelligence in education.

== Education ==
Koedinger received a B.S. in mathematics and computer science from the University of Wisconsin–Madison in 1984, graduating with distinction. He received an M.S. in computer science from the same university in 1986. He subsequently studied cognitive psychology at Carnegie Mellon University, receiving a Ph.D. in 1990. His doctoral adviser was psychologist John R. Anderson.

Before completing his doctoral studies, Koedinger worked as a knowledge engineer on the MENDEL intelligent tutoring system project at the University of Wisconsin–Madison. He also taught mathematics and computer programming, including a period teaching high-school geometry in Pittsburgh, an experience that informed his later work on educational technology.

== Academic career ==
After completing his Ph.D., Koedinger held a McDonnell postdoctoral fellowship in cognitive studies and educational practice in Carnegie Mellon's Department of Psychology from 1990 to 1993. He joined the Human-Computer Interaction Institute as a research computer scientist in 1993 and subsequently became a senior research scientist and associate professor. He became a professor in 2005.

Koedinger was appointed the Hillman Professorship of Computer Science in 2017. In 2025, he was selected as a University Professor at Carnegie Mellon.

== Research ==
Koedinger's work has addressed mathematics learning, problem solving, knowledge acquisition, transfer, student modeling, help seeking, metacognition, educational data mining, and learning analytics. His research has included both laboratory studies and studies conducted in actual courses and classrooms, with educational technologies used to collect detailed records of student interactions.

=== Cognitive tutors ===
Koedinger was among the researchers who developed the Cognitive Tutor approach to intelligent tutoring systems at Carnegie Mellon. The systems use computational models of student knowledge to provide individualized assistance while students solve problems. The technology was initially developed for mathematics and subsequently extended to other subject areas, including science and language learning.

The research underlying the Cognitive Tutor approach grew out of work conducted by Koedinger and John Anderson on applying cognitive models to mathematics education. Rather than providing feedback only on a student’s answer to a problem, the systems were designed to monitor students' problem-solving steps and provide assistance on their process coming up with answers.

The Cognitive Tutor approach became the basis for Carnegie Learning, an educational technology company founded in 1998 by researchers including Koedinger, Anderson, Steven Ritter, and William Hadley. The company commercialized mathematics curricula incorporating the Cognitive Tutor technology.

Koedinger's work also examined how intelligent tutors could support metacognitive skills. In research with Vincent Aleven, Ido Roll, Bruce McLaren and others, he studied tutoring systems that provided feedback on students' help-seeking behavior rather than solely on their performance on the subject matter being learned.

Knowledge-Learning-Instruction Framework (KLI Framework)

In 2012, Koedinger, Albert T. Corbett, and Charles Perfetti proposed the Knowledge-Learning-Instruction (KLI) framework in the journal Cognitive Science. The framework was intended to connect findings from cognitive science more directly to instructional design and to provide a structure for developing and testing theories of learning and instruction. A central concept in the framework is the knowledge component, defined as an acquired unit of cognitive function or structure that can be inferred from performance on related tasks. The framework distinguishes different types of knowledge and learning processes and considers how these differences can affect the instructional conditions that support robust learning. The authors identified three broad classes of learning processes: memory and fluency processes, induction and refinement processes, and understanding and sense-making processes. The framework was designed to generate testable hypotheses concerning the relationships among kinds of knowledge, learning processes, assessment, and instruction.

=== Educational data mining and learning analytics ===
Koedinger and collaborators developed LearnLab DataShop, a repository and set of analysis tools for fine-grained learner interaction data. DataShop was designed to facilitate analysis of student learning data generated by intelligent tutoring systems and other educational technologies.

A 2008 paper by Koedinger, Kyle Cunningham, Alida Skogsholm and Brett Leber describing an open repository and analysis tools for longitudinal learner data received the Educational Data Mining Test of Time Award in 2017.

Koedinger has also been involved in LearnSphere, a web-based infrastructure that integrates educational datasets and analytic resources and provides tools for conducting learning-data analyses.

=== LearnLab and the Pittsburgh Science of Learning Center ===
Koedinger has directed LearnLab which was developed from the Pittsburgh Science of Learning Center (PSLC), an interdisciplinary research center supported by the National Science Foundation and involving Carnegie Mellon University and the University of Pittsburgh.

== Recognition ==
Koedinger received the Allen Newell Award for Research Excellence from Carnegie Mellon's School of Computer Science in 2001 for work at the intersection of computer science and psychology, including cognitive modeling and tutoring systems.

He was named a Fellow of the Cognitive Science Society in 2018.

In 2023, Koedinger was named a Fellow of the Association for Computing Machinery for "the advancement of AI models of human learning and developing intelligent tutors to aid students."

His other recognitions include the Educational Data Mining Test of Time Award, the Distinguished Development Award from the Association for Educational Communications and Technology, and multiple best-paper awards at conferences in artificial intelligence in education, intelligent tutoring systems, and educational data mining.

In 2026, Koedinger received the Lifetime Achievement Award from the International Artificial Intelligence in Education Society. The award was presented at the 2026 Festival of Learning in Seoul, South Korea.

== Selected publications ==
- Koedinger, Kenneth R.; Corbett, Albert T.; Perfetti, Charles (2012). "The Knowledge‐Learning‐Instruction Framework: Bridging the Science‐Practice Chasm to Enhance Robust Student Learning". Cognitive Science. 36 (5): 757–798. doi:10.1111/j.1551-6709.2012.01245.x. ISSN 0364-0213.
- Koedinger, Kenneth R.; Stamper, John C.; Leber, Brett; Skogsholm, Alida (2013-06-19). "LearnLab's DataShop: A Data Repository and Analytics Tool Set for Cognitive Science". Topics in Cognitive Science. 5 (3): 668–669. doi:10.1111/tops.12035. ISSN 1756-8757.
- Feng, Mingyu; Heffernan, Neil; Koedinger, Kenneth (2009). "Addressing the assessment challenge with an online system that tutors as it assesses". User Modeling and User-Adapted Interaction. 19 (3): 243–266. doi:10.1007/s11257-009-9063-7. ISSN 0924-1868.
- Koedinger, Kenneth R.; Carvalho, Paulo F.; Liu, Ran; McLaughlin, Elizabeth A. (2023-03-28). "An astonishing regularity in student learning rate". Proceedings of the National Academy of Sciences. 120 (13). doi:10.1073/pnas.2221311120. ISSN 0027-8424.

== See also ==
- Learning Sciences
- Cognitive Tutor
- Learning sciences
- ACT-R
- John Robert Anderson (psychologist)
- Vincent Aleven
- Ryan Baker
- Bruce M. McLaren
