= Pittsburgh Science of Learning Center =

The Pittsburgh Science of Learning Center (aka LearnLab) is a Science of Learning Center funded by the National Science Foundation and managed by Carnegie Mellon University and the University of Pittsburgh. The PSLC is led by Kenneth Koedinger and Charles Perfetti, and includes many other notable scientists, including Vincent Aleven and David Klahr.

The PSLC theory wiki collects and organizes research results, including a list of instructional principles that are supported by learning science research. The wiki is open and freely editable.

Several notable tools, methods, and theories were developed at the PSLC, including DataShop, LearnSphere, the Knowledge-Learning-Instruction Framework, and the Baker Rodrigo Ocumpaugh Monitoring Protocol.
