= Cognitive tutor =

Automated tutor

A cognitive tutor is a particular kind of intelligent tutoring system that utilizes a cognitive model to provide feedback to students as they are working through problems. This feedback will immediately inform students of the correctness, or incorrectness, of their actions in the tutor interface; however, cognitive tutors also have the ability to provide context-sensitive hints and instruction to guide students towards reasonable next steps.

== Introduction ==
The name of Cognitive Tutor now usually refers to a particular type of intelligent tutoring system produced by Carnegie Learning for high school mathematics based on John Anderson's ACT-R theory of human cognition. However, cognitive tutors were originally developed to test ACT-R theory for research purposes since the early 1980s and they are developed also for other areas and subjects such as computer programming and science. Cognitive Tutors can be implemented into classrooms as a part of blended learning that combines textbook and software activities.

The Cognitive Tutor programs utilize cognitive model and are based on model tracing and knowledge tracing. Model tracing means that the cognitive tutor checks every action performed by students such as entering a value or clicking a button, while knowledge tracing is used to calculate the required skills students learned by measuring them on a bar chart called Skillometer. Model tracing and knowledge tracing are essentially used to monitor students' learning progress, guide students to correct path to problem solving, and provide feedback.

The Institute of Education Sciences published several reports regarding the effectiveness of Carnegie Cognitive Tutor. A 2013 report concluded that Carnegie Learning Curricula and Cognitive Tutor was found to have mixed effects on mathematics achievement for high school students. The report identified 27 studies that investigate the effectiveness of Cognitive Tutor, and the conclusion is based on 6 studies that meet What Works Clearinghouse standards. Among the 6 studies included, 5 of them show intermediate to significant positive effect, while 1 study shows statistically significant negative effect. Another report published by Institute of Education Sciences in 2009 found that Cognitive Tutor Algebra I to have potentially positive effects on math achievement based on only 1 study out of 14 studies that meets What Works Clearinghouse standards. It should be understood that What Works Clearinghouse standards call for relatively large numbers of participants, true random assignments to groups, and for a control group receiving either no treatment or a different treatment. Such experimental conditions are difficult to meet in schools, and thus only a small percentage of studies in education meet the standards of this clearinghouse, even though they may still be of value.

== Theoretical foundations ==
=== Four-component architecture ===
Intelligent tutoring systems (ITS) have a four-component architecture: a domain model, a student model, a tutoring model and an interface component.

The domain model contains the rules, concepts, and knowledge related to the domain to be learned. It helps to evaluate students' performance and detect students' errors by setting a standard of domain expertise.

The student model, the central component of an ITS, is expected to contain knowledge about the students: their cognitive and affective states, and their progress as they learn. The function of the student model is threefold: to gather data from and about the learner, to represent the learner's knowledge and learning process, and to perform diagnostics of a student's knowledge and select optimal pedagogical strategies.

The tutoring model uses the data gained from the domain model and student model to make decisions about tutoring strategies such as whether or not to intervene, or when and how to intervene. Functions of the tutoring model include instruction delivery and content planning.

The interface component reflects the decisions made by the tutoring model in different forms such as Socratic dialogs, feedback and hints. Students interact with the tutor through the learning interface, also known as communication. The interface provides domain knowledge elements.

=== Cognitive model ===
A cognitive model replicates the domain knowledge and skills comparable to that of a human expert or an advanced student of the domain. A cognitive model enables intelligent tutoring systems to respond to problem-solving situations in a way similar to a human tutor. A tutoring system adopting a cognitive model is called a cognitive tutor.

A cognitive model is an expert system that generates a multitude of solutions to the problems presented to students. The cognitive model is used to trace each student's solution through complex alternative solution paths, enabling the tutor to provide step-by-step feedback and advice, and to maintain a targeted model of the student's knowledge based on student performance.

=== Cognitive Tutors ===
Cognitive Tutors provide step-by-step guidance as a learner develops a complex problem-solving skill through practice. Typically, cognitive tutors provide such forms of support as: (a) a problem-solving environment that is designed rich and "thinking visible"; (b) step-by-step feedback on student performance; (c) feedback messages specific to errors; (d) context-specific next-step hints at student's request, and (e) individualized problem selection.

Cognitive Tutors accomplish two of the principal tasks characteristic of human tutoring: (1) monitors the student's performance and providing context-specific individual instruction, and (2) monitors the student's learning and selects appropriate problem-solving activities.

Both cognitive model and two underlying algorithms, model tracing and knowledge tracing, are used to monitor the student's learning. In model tracing, the cognitive tutor uses the cognitive model in complex problems to follow the student's individual path and provide prompt accuracy feedback and context-specific advice. In knowledge tracing, the cognitive tutor uses a Bayesian Knowledge Tracing method of evaluating the student's knowledge and uses this student model to select appropriate problems for each student.

=== Cognitive architecture ===
Cognitive tutor development is guided by ACT-R cognitive architecture, which specifies the underlying framework developing the cognitive model or expert component of a cognitive tutor.

ACT-R, a member of the ACT family, is the most recent cognitive architecture, devoted primarily to modelling human behavior. ACT-R includes a declarative memory of factual knowledge and a procedural memory of production rules. The architecture functions by matching productions on perceptions and facts, mediated by the real-valued activation levels of objects, and executing them to affect the environment or alter declarative memory. ACT-R has been used to model psychological aspects such as memory, attention, reasoning, problem solving, and language processing.

== Application and utilization ==
The first real world applications of cognitive tutors were in the 1980s and involved a geometry proof tutor used by high school students and a LISP programming tutor used by college students in a mini course in introductory programming course at Carnegie Mellon University.

Since then, cognitive tutors have been used in a variety of scenarios, with a few organizations developing their own cognitive tutor programs. These programs have been used with students spanning elementary school through university level, though primarily in the subject areas of Computer Programming, Mathematics, and Science.

One of the first organizations to develop a system for use within the school system was the PACT Center at Carnegie Mellon University. Their aim was to "...develop systems that provide individualized assistance to students as they work on challenging real-world problems in complex domains such as computer programming, algebra and geometry". PACT's most successful product was the Cognitive Tutor Algebra course. Originally created in the early 1990s, this course was in use in 75 schools through the U.S. by 1999, and then its spin-off company, Carnegie Learning, now offers tutors to thousands of schools in the U.S.

The Carnegie Mellon Cognitive Tutor has been shown to raise students' math test scores in high school and middle-school classrooms, and their Algebra course was designated one of five exemplary curricula for K-12 mathematics educated by the US Department of Education. There were several research projects conducted by the PACT Center to utilize Cognitive tutor for courses in Excel and to develop an intelligent tutoring system for algebra expression writing, called Ms. Lindquist. Further, in 2005, Carnegie Learning released Bridge to Algebra, a product intended for middle schools that was piloted in over 100 schools.

Cognitive tutoring software is continuing to be used. According to a Business Insider Report article, Ken Koedinger, a professor of human-computer interaction and psychology at Carnegie Mellon University, describes how teachers can integrate cognitive tutoring software into the classroom. He suggests that teachers use it in a computer lab environment or during classes. Cognitive tutors can understand the many ways that a student might answer a problem, and then assist the student at the exact time that the help is required. Further, the cognitive tutor can customize exercises specific to the student's needs.

== Limitations ==
At this time it is unclear whether Cognitive Tutor is effective at improving student performance. Cognitive Tutor has had some commercial success however, there may be limitations inherently linked to its design and the nature of intelligent tutoring systems. The following section discusses limitations of Cognitive Tutor which may also apply to other intelligent tutoring systems.

=== Curriculum ===
At this time, creating a Cognitive Tutor for all subject areas is not practical or economical. Cognitive Tutor has been used successfully but is still limited to tutoring algebra, computer programming and geometry because these subject areas have an optimal balance of production rules, complexity and maximum benefit to the learner.

The focus of Cognitive Tutor development has been the design of the software to teach specific production rules and not on the development of curricular content. Despite many years of trials, improvements, and a potential to advance learning objectives, the creators continue to rely primarily on outside sources for curricular direction.

=== Design ===
The complexity of Cognitive Tutor software requires designers to spend hundreds of hours per instructional hour to create the program. Despite the time invested, the challenges associated with meeting the needs of the learner within the constraints of the design often result in compromises in flexibility and cognitive fidelity.

Practicality dictates that designers must choose from a discrete set of methods to teach and support learners. Limited choices of methods, prompts and hints may be effective in supporting some learners but may conflict with the methods already in use by others. In addition, it is possible that learners will use the system of prompts and hints to access the answers prematurely thereby advancing through the exercises which may result in them not meeting the learning objectives.

=== Model ===
The cognitive model, which inspired Cognitive Tutor is based on assumptions about how learning occurs which dictates the chosen instructional methods such as hints, directions and timing of the tutoring prompts. Given these assumptions, Cognitive Tutor do not account for all the diverse ways human tutors support student learning.

== See also ==
- Educational psychology
