= Cognitive-Affective Theory of Learning with Media =

The Cognitive-Affective Theory of Learning with Media (CATLM) is an educational psychology and instructional design framework developed by cognitive scientist Roxana Moreno and educational psychologist Richard E. Mayer. The theory explains how cognitive, affective (emotional and motivational), and metacognitive processes interact when learning from interactive multimodal instructional media, such as virtual reality, agent based learning environments (with animated pedagogical guides or virtual tutors) and case based learning environments (such as interactive science simulations or problem solving scenarios) .

CATLM expands on Mayer's Cognitive Theory of Multimedia Learning (CTML) and John Sweller's Cognitive Load Theory (CLT) by adding emotional and motivational states as key factors that influence how much mental effort a student puts in while learning through digital tools.

== Background and development ==
Before its development, much of the research done in educational technology focused on the cognitive architecture, specifically on how the human mind processes verbal and pictorial information through separate working memory channels. These frameworks provided guidelines to reduce extraneous cognitive load in static or linear presentation media. But, as educational technology expanded to include tools guided by learner interaction, the existing models became too limited to fully capture these dynamic learning experiences.

Roxana Moreno and Richard E. Mayer formulated the Cognitive-Affective Theory of Learning with Media (CATLM) to bridge the gap between the existing theories and modern tools. It expanded on established theories, taking working memory concepts and combining them with the emotional, motivational and metacognitive factors that influence learning using modern digital tools.

=== The Developers ===
==== Roxana Moreno ====
Roxana Moreno (1964–2010) was born in the United States to Argentinian immigrant parents. She moved back to Argentina as a child and completed a Bachelor of Science in Economics as well as a law degree while there. Upon returning to the United States, she completed studies in artificial intelligence then began applying her technical knowledge to the field of education. She also received a doctorate in cognitive psychology from the University of California, Santa Barbara.

Moreno worked as an Educational Psychology professor at the University of New Mexico and focused her research on applying cognitive and motivation theories to develop principles for the instructional design of multimedia environments. She was also involved in developing educational programs that incorporated visual aids in student's primary language to foster academic achievement.

Over her career, Moreno authored the text Educational Psychology (2010) and co-edited Cognitive Load Theory (2010) alongside Jan Plass and Roland Brunken. Additionally, she co-authored numerous journal articles on multimedia learning, cognitive load and pedagogical agents. Moreno died on July 24, 2010 at the age of 50 in Albuquerque New Mexico, after a long period of illness.

==== Richard E. Mayer ====
Richard E. Mayer (born 1947) received a Bachelor of Arts in Psychology from Miami University and completed his doctorate in psychology at the University of Michigan in 1973. After serving as a visiting assistant professor at Indiana University, he joined the faculty at the University of California, Santa Barbara where he continues to serve as Distinguished Professor of Psychological and Brain Sciences.

Mayer's research focuses on the application of cognitive science to education with emphasis on multimedia learning, problem solving transfer, computer supported instruction and educational games. Over the course of his career, he has authored over 500 publications which includes 30 books such as Multimedia Learning and Learning as a Generative Activity: Eight Learning Strategies that Promote Understanding with L. Fiorella.

Beyond his work on media based learning, Mayer has served as President of Division 15 (Educational Psychology) of the American Psychological Association (APA) and Vice President of the American Educational Research Association (AERA) for Division C (Learning and Instruction). He is the winner of several awards including the Thorndike Award for career achievement in educational psychology, the Scribner Award for outstanding research in learning and instruction and the APA's Distinguished Contribution of Applications of Psychology to Education and Training Award. He also holds the #1 rank as the most productive educational psychologist in the world in both Contemporary Educational Psychology as well as Educational Psychology review and # 1 rank as the most cited educational psychologist in the world by Google Scholar

== Theoretical Model ==

Figure 1. Conceptual framework of the Cognitive-Affective Theory of Learning with Media (CATLM)

=== Description of the Model ===
The conceptual framework of CATLM illustrates how instructional media presents verbal and non-verbal information that enters the learner's cognitive system through distinct sensory channels. The incoming data is selected and organized within working memory before being integrated with prior knowledge in long-term memory.

Unlike strictly cognitive frameworks, the model incorporates an affective, motivational and metacognitive architecture that operate alongside the cognitive pathways. These act as regulatory mechanisms that mediate attention and perception for the initial selection of incoming information, directly governs working memory operations and interact dynamically with long-term memory structures.

=== Core Assumptions ===
CATLM builds upon seven assumptions that are suggested by cognitive and motivational research. These assumptions can be viewed as inherited from foundational theories or extended specifically for CATLM.

Foundational Cognitive assumptions (Inherited from CTML)

- Dual Channel Assumption: Visual and verbal information are processed through separate channels
- Limited Capacity Assumption: Processing channels are limited and can only handle a few pieces of information at any time
- Active Processing Assumption: Meaningful learning occurs when effort is exerted in cognitive processes such as selecting, organizing and integrating new information into existing schemas

Extended CATLM assumptions

- Long term memory Hypothesis: Long term memory contains a dynamic structure that holds both past experiences and memory for general domain knowledge
- Affective Mediation Hypothesis: Cognitive engagement in the learning process can be influenced by motivational factors
- Metacognitive Mediation Hypothesis: Metacognitive factors influence learning by controlling cognitive processes and emotional states
- Individual Differences Hypothesis: The quantity of knowledge gained from specific media may be affected by differences in the learner's prior knowledge and abilities

=== Key Components and Cognitive-Affect Interactions ===
In CATLM, cognitive processing is understood as a dynamic interaction among memory systems and affective regulators

==== Memory systems ====
Incoming verbal and visual stimuli from an interactive multimedia tool first enter the sensory memory through separate auditory and visual channels. When the learner pays attention to these, the information is passed into the working memory where it is actively selected, organized and integrated into existing representations. The information is then passed to long-term memory where prior knowledge is retrieved to assist in processing and new representations are stored for later recall.

==== Types of Cognitive Processing ====
1. Extraneous processing-processing that is not necessary for making sense of new information. It originates from poor design of the tool such as text and corresponding graphic on separate pages or screens.
2. Representational holding- this is a subclass of extraneous processing where learners hold a mental representation in working memory while trying to make meaning. An example includes when narration is presented before an animation.
3. Essential processing- this is the selection of new information to be represented in working memory
4. Generative processing-making sense of the new information by organizing it into coherent structures then integrating it with prior knowledge to be stored in long term memory.

==== Metacognitive Regulation ====
By recognizing their own emotional state, students can better regulate their learning with interactive multimedia by planning their approach, monitoring the cognitive processes and adjusting their strategies when needed.

== Instructional Design Principles ==
There are five key instructional design principles specifically for interactive and multimodal learning environments grounded in CATLM. The table below summarizes these principles, their descriptions and theoretical rationales.

CATLM Interactive Design Principles, Description and rationale
Principle	Description	Theoretical Rationale
Guided Activity	Learning is improved when students are allowed to interact with a pedagogical agent who helps guide their cognitive processing	Guided activity encourages students to engage in the selection, organization and integration of new information (encourages essential and generative processing)
Reflection	Learning is improved when students are asked to reflect on correct answers	Reflection encourages active organization and integration of new information (promotes essential and generative processing)
Feedback	Learning is improved with explanatory feedback rather than with corrective feedback only	Explanatory feedback provides student with proper schemas to repair misconceptions and so reduces extraneous processing (reduces extraneous processing)
Pacing	Learning is improved when students can control the pace of the presentation of the instructional materials	Pacing allows students to process smaller chunks of information in working memory by reducing representational holding (reduces representational holding)
Pretraining	Learning is improved when students receive focused pretraining to activate prior knowledge	Pretraining helps to guide the learner's processing by showing them which aspects of prior knowledge to integrate with incoming information (guides generative processing)

=== Applications ===
CATLM has been applied to the design of the following multimedia learning tools:

1. Computer simulations
2. Computer based instruction
3. Online learning
4. Serious games
5. Virtual Reality Learning

== Empirical Research on the Model ==
Research indicated that the features and social cues of multimedia learning environments directly influence student affect, motivation and cognitive processing. Studies investigating emotional design such as the strategic use of features like warm colours, rounded shapes, and layouts, as well as the social presence of a pedagogical agent demonstrated that these elements induced positive affective states and heightened levels of motivation. Studies also reported improved cognitive engagement and mental processing as well as increased use of self regulation strategies.

Research exploring instructional control demonstrated how presentation pace interacted with emotional design to regulate cognitive capacity. When positive visual emotional design was paired with learner-controlled pacing, the self-pacing mechanism acted as a moderator that prevented working memory overload. Findings showed that self-pacing enabled the positive affective design features to directly enhance retention, comprehension and learning transfer.

Empirical evidence evaluating internal learner characteristics supported the premise that individual differences moderate how students respond to affective media design Because learners interpret features and usability based on personal traits, their cognitive and emotional responses vary. Studies using different visual emotional features showed that learners with lower emotional intelligence exhibited preference for positive emotional designs to support engagement, while learners with higher emotional intelligence maintained high cognitive engagement across many emotional presentations. These findings validate that individual differences in perception interact with affective design elements to influence learning outcomes.

In an empirical evaluation of CATLM within virtual reality, Structural Equation Modeling ,SEM, was used to test the connection between features of learning tool, affective states, cognitive load and achievement. The findings demonstrated that motivation directly increased generative cognitive engagement. Additionally, motivation reduced perceived cognitive load.

== Limitations and Criticisms ==
Despite its contributions to multimedia learning, CATLM has tow primary limitations.

The original model focuses heavily on individual cognitive and affective architecture but fails to account for social presence, peer interaction and collaborative dynamics in multimedia environments.

CATML was developed for classic multimedia. As technology advanced and more immersive, high arousal environments such as virtual reality were introduced, the mechanics of the theory could not explain how these interact with real-time emotional processing and cognitive load.

== Extensions of the Model ==
Due to limitations of the model, CATLM became the foundation on which other models were based. Extended models include:

1. CASTLE-Cognitive-Affective-Social Theory of Learning in digital Environments which integrates the role of social influences in learning with digital materials
2. CATML-VR-Cognitive-Affective Theory of ML in Virtual reality which adapts the core constructs of CATML into virtual reality environments

== Key Publications ==
- Moreno, R. (2006). Does the modality principle hold always? Examining the bounds of multimedia instruction. Journal of Educational Psychology, 98 (1), 194–205
- Moreno, R. & Mayer, R.E. (2007). Interactive multimodal learning environments. Educational Psychology Review, 19 (3), 309–326
- Park, B., Plass, J. L., & Brünken, R. (2014). Cognitive and affective processes in multimedia learning. Learning and Instruction, 29, 125–127
- Mayer, R.E., & Fiorella, L. (2022). The Cambridge handbook of multimedia learning. Cambridge University Press

== See also ==
- Cognitive Theory of Multimedia Learning
- Cognitive Load Theory
- Educational Psychology
- Instructional Design
- Dual-Coding Theory
- Pedagogical agents
