= Joseph Magliano (psychologist) =

American cognitive psychologist

Joseph P. Magliano
- Education: University of Dayton; University of Memphis
- Known for: Scene Perception and Event Comprehension Theory; Reading Strategy Assessment Tool; Narrative comprehension and event cognition
- Awards: Fellow, Society for Text and Discourse; Fellow, Society for Cognitive Studies of the Moving Image
- Scientific career
- Fields: Cognitive psychology, Educational psychology
- Workplaces: Georgia State University
- Doctoral advisor: Arthur C. Graesser

Joseph P. Magliano is an American cognitive psychologist and professor of educational psychology in the Department of Learning Sciences at Georgia State University. He is a nationally recognized leading researcher in narrative comprehension, event cognition, and the processing of visual media. Magliano is best known for co-developing the Scene Perception and Event Comprehension Theory, a major theoretical framework that explains how people construct coherent mental models from film, comics, picture stories, and other visual narratives. His research bridges cognitive psychology and education, with practical applications in reading assessment, postsecondary literacy support, and media comprehension. His publications have been cited more than 13,000 times.

== Education and career ==
Magliano received his B.A. in psychology from the University of Dayton (1987), and his M.S. (1990) and Ph.D. (1992) in cognitive psychology from the University of Memphis, where he was mentored by Arthur C. Graesser, a pioneer in discourse psychology. He subsequently completed postdoctoral research with Tom Trabasso at the University of Chicago. In 2018, he was recruited to Georgia State University as part of the university's prestigious Second Century Initiative (2CI) to strengthen research excellence. Prior to that, he served as Professor of Psychology and Director of the Center for the Interdisciplinary Study of Language and Literacy at Northern Illinois University.

== Research ==
Magliano's work investigates the cognitive mechanisms that allow humans to understand and remember events across different media. A cornerstone of his research is the Scene Perception and Event Comprehension Theory, co-developed with Lester C. Loschky and colleagues. This theory integrates low-level visual perception with higher-level narrative processing, explaining why certain film edits or comic panel transitions feel natural while others disrupt comprehension.

He also co-developed the Reading Strategy Assessment Tool, a computer-based instrument that analyzes readers’ constructed responses in real time to identify comprehension strengths and weaknesses. This tool has been widely used in postsecondary literacy programs and research on adult learners. Magliano’s studies further examine individual differences in reading motivation, strategic processing, and the effects of cinematic techniques (such as editing and sound design) on memory and understanding.

His research has received funding from the U.S. Department of Education and has direct implications for improving college readiness and supporting students in community colleges.

== Academic leadership and honors ==
Magliano serves as co-editor of Projections: The Journal for Movies and Mind, the official journal of the Society for Cognitive Studies of the Moving Image. He is a past Chair of the Governing Board of the Society for Text and Discourse (2019–2025) and a past President of the Society for Computers in Psychology. He is a Fellow of both the Society for Text and Discourse and the Society for Cognitive Studies of the Moving Image. In 2024 he received the Outstanding Reviewer Award from the journal Scientific Studies of Reading.

== Selected publications ==
- Loschky, L. C., Larson, A. M., Smith, T. J., & Magliano, J. P. (2020). The scene perception and event comprehension theory (SPECT) applied to visual narratives. Topics in Cognitive Science, 12(1), 311–351. doi:10.1111/tops.12451
- McNamara, D. S., & Magliano, J. P. (2009). Toward a comprehensive model of comprehension. In B. H. Ross (Ed.), Psychology of Learning and Motivation (Vol. 51, pp. 297–384). Academic Press.
- Magliano, J. P., Millis, K. K., Levinstein, I., & the RSAT Development Team. (2011). Assessing comprehension during reading with the Reading Strategy Assessment Tool (RSAT). Metacognition and Learning, 6(2), 131–154.
- Magliano, J. P., Talwar, A., Feller, D. P., Wang, Z., et al. (2023). Exploring thresholds in the foundational skills for reading and comprehension outcomes in the context of postsecondary readers. Journal of Learning Disabilities, 56(1), 43–57. doi:10.1177/00222194221087387
