= Expertise reversal effect =

Educational concept

The expertise reversal effect refers to the reversal of the effectiveness of instructional techniques on learners with differing levels of prior knowledge. The primary recommendation that stems from the expertise reversal effect is that instructional design methods need to be adjusted as learners acquire more knowledge in a specific domain. Expertise is described as "the ability to perform fluently in a specific class of tasks."

Instructional techniques that assist learners to create long term memory schema are more effective for novices or low-knowledge individuals, who approach a learning situation or task without these knowledge structures to rely on. In contrast, for higher-knowledge learners or experts, i.e. learners with more prior knowledge of the task, the reverse is true, such that reduced guidance often results in better performance than well-guided instruction. Slava Kalyuga, one of the leading researchers in this area, writes, "instructional guidance, which may be essential for novices, may have negative consequences for more experienced learners."

The expertise reversal effect is a specific example of an aptitude by treatment interaction (ATI), which is a more general phenomenon in which learning environments that have positive effects for one type of person have neutral or even negative effects for another type of person.

== Cognitive load theory ==
The expertise reversal effect is typically explained within a cognitive load framework. Cognitive load theory assumes that a learner's existing cognitive resources can influence the effectiveness of instructional techniques. The goal of any learning task is to construct integrated mental representations of the relevant information, which requires considerable working memory resources. To accomplish the task without overwhelming working memory, some form of guidance is needed.

Low-knowledge learners lack schema-based knowledge in the target domain and so this guidance comes from instructional supports, which help reduce the cognitive load associated with novel tasks. If the instruction fails to provide guidance, low-knowledge learners often resort to inefficient problem-solving strategies that overwhelm working memory and increase cognitive load. Thus, low-knowledge learners benefit more from well-guided instruction than from reduced guidance.

In contrast, higher-knowledge learners enter the situation with schema-based knowledge, which provides internal guidance. If additional instructional guidance is provided it can result in the processing of redundant information and increased cognitive load. "Learners would have to relate and reconcile the related components of available long-term memory base and externally provided guidance. Such integration processes may impose an additional working memory load and reduce resources available for learning new knowledge." In this case, the external guidance becomes redundant relative to the learner's internal schemas and is less beneficial than a reduced-guidance technique.

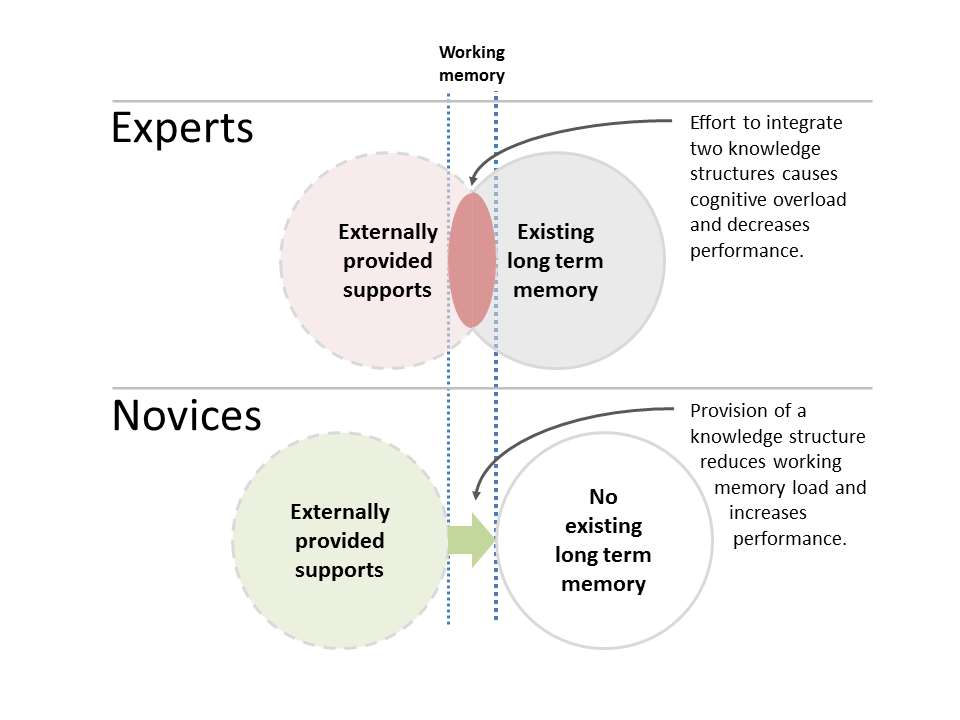
The differing effect of externally provided instructional guidance on learners with varying levels of prior knowledge

Although this cognitive load theory-driven explanation for the expertise reversal effect is plausible, there are a few caveats to keep in mind. First, many studies that demonstrate expertise reversal effects rely on subjective measures of cognitive load. For example, one common measure is to have learners rate task difficulty by answering the following question on a scale from 1 (extremely easy) to 7 (extremely difficult): "How easy or difficult was it to complete this task?" Some researchers claim that such ratings are increasingly being used as an effective and valid measure of subjective cognitive load. However, others question the use of subjective measures. For example, some question people's ability to provide accurate self-reports of mental effort. Others suggest that there is no way to know how subjective ratings relate to actual cognitive load. Second, expertise reversal effects have been found in studies outside of the cognitive load paradigm, indicating that alternative explanations remain viable. For example, a number of explanations center on motivational processes.

== Examples ==
The expertise reversal effect has been found in a variety of domains and for a variety of instructional techniques. Listed below are just a small set of examples, all of which are described more thoroughly in Kalyuga, Ayres, Chandler, & Sweller, 2003.

Interactions between levels of knowledge and the worked-example effect: Worked examples provide a problem statement followed by a step-by-step demonstration of how to solve it. Worked examples are often contrasted with open-ended problem solving in which the learner is responsible for providing the step-by-step solution. Low-knowledge learners benefit more from studying structured worked-out examples than from solving problems on their own. However, as knowledge increases, open-ended problem solving becomes the more effective learning activity.

Interactions between levels of knowledge and the imagination effect: The imagination effect occurs when imagining the instructional material is more effective than studying the instructional material. The idea is that imagining the material supports the generation and construction of mental representations. Generally, low-knowledge learners benefit more from studying instructional material than from imagining it. However, as knowledge increases, imagining a procedure or set of relations becomes the more effective learning activity.

Interactions between levels of knowledge and the split attention effect: The split attention effect occurs when two or more related sources of information are presented apart from one another in time or space (e.g., text located separately from a diagram). Mentally integrating the two pieces can require considerable working memory resources. If the sources provide similar information, there are two options to reduce split attention: one is physically to integrate the two sources of the information and the other is simply to eliminate one of them. For low-knowledge learners, physical integration of two or more sources of information is more beneficial than eliminating one of the sources. However, as knowledge increases, eliminating one of the sources becomes the more effective instructional method.

Interactions between levels of knowledge and segmentation in multimedia learning: Segmentation is a strategy used to manage cognitive load, particularly with multimedia learning. By creating breaks in the instructional material (for example, dividing animations into several videos), segmentation reduces cognitive load by giving the learner time to process and reflect on the information. In addition, segments indicate what information is important by chunking information. Research conducted by Spanjers et al. (2011) suggests an expertise reversal effect when using segmentation in animations. While low knowledge learners benefited from learning from animated material that was segmented, high-knowledge learners did not. While there was no difference in performance in this study, participants indicated a difference in mental effort and efficiency between low knowledge learners and high prior knowledge learners. The authors recommend that segmentation of animation be used for low prior knowledge learners, and using continuous animation for high prior knowledge learners.

== Addressing ==
=== Adaptive fading in worked examples ===
Studies addressing the expertise reversal effect have found worked examples, particularly those which "tailor fading of worked examples to individual students' growing expertise levels", to be effective in improving learning results (Atkinson et al. 2003; Renkl et al. 2002, 2004; Renkl and Atkinson 2007). Worked examples reduce cognitive load, reducing the "problem-solving demand by providing worked-out solutions."

A key consideration in the success of worked examples is the use of gradual fading of worked-out steps as the learner progresses through the instruction. While fixed fading (previously decided fading points with no individual connection to the learner) provides better results than general problem solving, results from adaptive fading showed even better learner knowledge acquisition. Adaptive fading is the fading of worked-out steps in response to learner demonstration of understanding, allowing for higher knowledge learners to progress in a way that minimizes the expertise reversal effect.

The advent of intelligent instructional software such as cognitive tutor, which can trace student learning and assess knowledge acquisition, provides a platform within which adaptive fading can be applied. In response to learner assessments, the software can provide embedded "adaptive individualized example fading mechanism[s]". To ensure that learners do not experience the expertise reversal effect, such software must conduct further, ongoing assessment of learner progress and make adjustments to adapt and provide "optimal example fading" that addresses the individual learner's needs.

== See also ==
- Tracking (education)
