= Arthur C. Graesser =

American psychologist (born 1950)

- Born: 1950 (age 75–76)
- Education: University of California, San Diego (PhD)
- Scientific career
- Fields: Cognitive psychology; Educational psychology; Educational data mining
- Workplaces: University of Memphis; University of Oxford

Arthur C. Graesser (born 1950) is a professor of psychology and intelligent systems at the University of Memphis and is an honorary research fellow in education at the University of Oxford.

== Biography ==
Graesser was born in 1950 and received his Ph.D. in psychology from the University of California, San Diego.

He has served as the editor of the Journal of Educational Psychology and Discourse Processes, has been president of four scientific societies, and has published over 600 scientific articles and three books, garnering over 100,000 citations.

He is widely known for his role in the development of a range of intelligent tutoring systems, including the AutoTutor platform, and Operation ARA, co-developed with Diane F. Halpern and distributed by Pearson Education. He also co-led the development of Coh-Metrix computational tool that produces linguistic, coherence, and discourse measures on texts.

== Awards ==
In 2018, Graesser was awarded the Harold W. McGraw Jr. Prize in Education. Graesser has also been awarded the Distinguished Scientific Contribution Award from the Society for Text and Discourse and the Distinguished Contributions of Applications of Psychology to Education and Training Award from the American Psychological Association.

Graesser has also been awarded a Lifetime Achievement Award by the International Society for Artificial Intelligence in Education, one of only two such awards bestowed as of 2023.
