= Roxana Moreno =

Argentine-American cognitive scientist

Roxana Arleen Moreno (1960–2010) was an Argentine-American cognitive scientist and educational psychologist, known for her work on cognitive load and multimedia learning.

== Education and career ==
Moreno was born in Detroit, on October 25, 1960, to a family of Argentine immigrants who returned to Argentina when she was six.

After a 1984 bachelor's degree in economics at the University of Buenos Aires, Moreno received a juris doctor from the University of Buenos Aires in 1985. She held various teaching positions in Argentina from 1985 to 1990.

By 1995 she had moved to California, and passed the state bar. She began studying psychology at the University of California, Santa Barbara, received a master's degree in 1998, and completed her Ph.D. in 1999. Her dissertation, Introducing Social Cues in Multimedia Learning: The Role of Pedagogic Agents' Image and Language in a Scientific Lesson, was supervised by Richard E. Mayer.

After postdoctoral research funded by a National Science Foundation postdoctoral fellowship, she joined the educational psychology program at the University of New Mexico in 2000. She became an associate professor there before dying of a long illness on July 24, 2010.

== Recognition ==
Contemporary Educational Psychology recognized Moreno as "one of the top 20 most productive educational psychologists in the world for 1991–2002". She was a 2003 recipient of the Presidential Early Career Award for Scientists and Engineers, given for "being an innovative researcher on how science teachers learn to apply principles of educational psychology to their classroom experiences through new technology tools and materials".

The American Psychological Association gave her their Richard E. Snow Award for Early Contributions. The American Educational Research Association named her as a fellow in 2010.

She was a University of New Mexico Regent's Lecturer two times.

== Selected publications ==
=== Books ===
- Moreno, Roxana (2009), Educational Psychology, John Wiley & Sons, Inc., ISBN 9780471789987
- Plass, Jan L.; Moreno, Roxana; Brünken, Roland (2010), Cognitive Load Theory, Cambridge University Press, ISBN 9780521860239

=== Articles ===
- Mayer, Richard E.; Moreno, Roxana (June 1998), "A split-attention effect in multimedia learning: Evidence for dual processing systems in working memory.", Journal of Educational Psychology, 90 (2): 312–320, doi:10.1037/0022-0663.90.2.312
- Moreno, Roxana; Mayer, Richard E. (June 1999), "Cognitive principles of multimedia learning: The role of modality and contiguity.", Journal of Educational Psychology, 91 (2): 358–368, doi:10.1037/0022-0663.91.2.358
- Mayer, Richard E.; Moreno, Roxana (2002), "Animation as an aid to multimedia learning", Educational Psychology Review, 14 (1): 87–99, doi:10.1023/a:1013184611077
- Mayer, Richard E.; Moreno, Roxana (January 2003), "Nine ways to reduce cognitive load in multimedia learning", Educational Psychologist, 38 (1): 43–52, doi:10.1207/s15326985ep3801_6
- Moreno, Roxana (January 2004), "Decreasing cognitive load for novice students: effects of explanatory versus corrective feedback in discovery-based multimedia", Instructional Science, 32 (1/2): 99–113, doi:10.1023/b:truc.0000021811.66966.1d
- Moreno, Roxana; Mayer, Richard (June 2007), "Interactive multimodal learning environments", Special Issue on Interactive Learning Environments: Contemporary Issues and Trends, Educational Psychology Review, 19 (3): 309–326, doi:10.1007/s10648-007-9047-2
