= Subgoal labeling =

Cognitive process

Subgoal labeling is giving a name to a group of steps, in a step-by-step description of a process, to explain how the group of steps achieve a related subgoal. This concept is used in the fields of cognitive science and educational psychology.

Lower-level steps of a worked example are grouped into a meaningful unit and labeled. This labeling helps learners identify the structural information from incidental information. Learning subgoals can reduce cognitive load when problem solving because the learner has fewer possible problem-solving steps to focus. Subgoal-labeled worked examples might provide learners with mental model frameworks. In a recent study, Learners who were given labels for subgoals used those labels when explaining how they solved a problem, suggesting that's how they mentally organized the information.

== Introduction ==
Generally problem solving adopts a very procedural approach. Problem solving in the areas of science, technology, engineering and mathematics (STEM) has been highly procedural. The best approach so far is to teach these procedures through instructional text accompanied by specific worked examples. The role of instructional text is to define and describe the problem solving procedures whereas how to apply these procedures is shown through worked examples. Students can learn from step-by-step approach of worked examples which later can be helpful to them in solving similar problems on their own. Novices, however, often find it difficult to distinguish domain specific information and the information specific to solving that problem, which increases their cognitive load. This cognitive load can be reduced by use of subgoal labeling which is achieved by grouping functionally-similar steps under a label that describes that function. This approach can be helpful to students to form a mental model of the domain related problem which later can guide them to solve different problems in that domain. Understanding the structure of worked example can help students identify the similarities between different problems thus encouraging self-explanation and learning.

== Application ==
Subgoal labels have been used in worked examples to teach learners to solve problems in STEM domains Pairing subgoal-labeled instructional text with subgoal-labeled worked examples can further improve learners' performance in problem solving in a computer-based learning environment (e.g. online learning) without personal interaction with an instructor. Subgoal labels can be used in different important areas such as teaching and learning novel problem solving, in training teachers to teach technical subjects (e.g. teaching computer programming), multi agent programming, professional development, online learning and other types of lifelong learning (e.g. subgoal-labeled instruction material helped novices to program in App Inventor for Android).

== See also ==
- Educational psychology
- Education technology
- E-learning
- Human-computer interaction
- Agent-based model
