= Pedagogical agent =

Simulated human-like interface for education

A pedagogical agent is a concept borrowed from computer science and artificial intelligence and applied to education, usually as part of an intelligent tutoring system (ITS). It is a simulated human-like interface between the learner and the content in an educational environment. A pedagogical agent is designed to model the type of interactions between a student and another person. Mabanza and de Wet define it as "a character enacted by a computer that interacts with the user in a socially engaging manner". A pedagogical agent can be assigned different roles in the learning environment, such as tutor or co-learner, depending on the desired purpose of the agent. "A tutor agent plays the role of a teacher, while a co-learner agent plays the role of a learning companion".

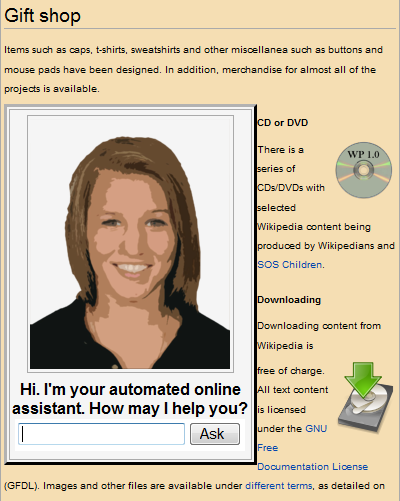
A computerized agent designed to facilitate interaction between the computer program and the person

== History ==
The history of Pedagogical Agents is closely aligned with the history of computer animation. As computer animation progressed, it was adopted by educators to enhance computerized learning by including a lifelike interface between the program and the learner. The first versions of a pedagogical agent were more cartoon than person, like Microsoft's Clippy which helped users of Microsoft Office load and use the program's features in 1997. However, with developments in computer animation, pedagogical agents can now look lifelike. By 2006, there was a call to develop modular, reusable agents to decrease the time and expertise required to create a pedagogical agent. There was also a call in 2009 to enact agent standards. The standardization and re-usability of pedagogical agents is less of an issue since the decrease in cost and widespread availability of animation tools. Individualized pedagogical agents can be found across disciplines including medicine, math, law, language learning, automotive, and armed forces. They are used in applications directed to every age, from preschool to adult.

== Learning theories related to pedagogical agent design ==
=== Distributed cognition theory ===
Distributed cognition theory is the method in which cognition progresses in the context of collaboration with others. Pedagogical agents can be designed to assist the cognitive transfer to the learner, operating as artifacts or partners with collaborative role in learning. To support the performance of an action by the user, the pedagogical agent can act as a cognitive tool as long as the agent is equipped with the knowledge that the user lacks. The interactions between the user and the pedagogical agent can facilitate a social relationship. The pedagogical agent may fulfill the role of a working partner.

=== Socio-cultural learning theory ===
Socio-cultural learning theory is how the user develops when they are involved in learning activities in which there is interaction with other agents. A pedagogical agent can: intervene when the user requests, provide support for tasks that the user cannot address, and potentially extend the learners cognitive reach. Interaction with the pedagogical agent may elicit a variety of emotions from the learner. The learner may become excited, confused, frustrated, and/or discouraged. These emotions affect the learners' motivation.

=== Extraneous Cognitive Load ===
Extraneous cognitive load is the extra effort being exerted by an individual's working memory due to the way information is being presented. A pedagogical agent can increase the user's cognitive load by distracting them and becoming the focus of their attention, causing split attention between the instructional material and the agent. Agents can reduce the perceived cognitive load by providing narration and personalization that can also promote a user's interest and motivation. While research on the reduction of cognitive load from pedagogical agents is minimal, more studies have shown that agents do not increase it.

== Effectiveness ==
It has been suggested by researchers that pedagogical agents may take on different roles in the learning environment. Examples of these roles are: supplanting, scaffolding, coaching, testing, or demonstrating or modelling a procedure. A pedagogical agent as a tutor has not been demonstrated to add any benefit to an educational strategy in equivalent lessons with and without a pedagogical agent. According to Richard Mayer, there is some support in research for pedagogical agent increasing learning, but only as a presenter of social cues. A co-learner pedagogical agent is believed to increase the student's self-efficacy. By pointing out important features of instructional content, a pedagogical agent can fulfill the signaling function, which research on multimedia learning has shown to enhance learning. Research has demonstrated that human-human interaction may not be completely replaced by pedagogical agents, but learners may prefer the agents to non-agent multimedia systems. This finding is supported by social agency theory.

Much like the varying effectiveness of the pedagogical agent roles in the learning environment, agents that take into account the user's affect have had mixed results. Research has shown pedagogical agents that make use of the users' affect have been found to increase user knowledge retention, motivation, and perceived self-efficacy. However, with such a broad range of modalities in affective expressions, it is often difficult to utilize them. Additionally, having agents detect a user's affective state with precision remains challenging, as displays of affect are different across individuals.

== Design ==
=== Attractiveness ===
The appearance of a pedagogical agent can be manipulated to meet the learning requirements. The attractiveness of a pedagogical agent can enhance student's learning when the users were the opposite gender of the pedagogical agent. Male students prefer a sexy appearance of a female pedagogical agents and dislike the sexy appearance of male agents. Female students were not attracted by the sexy appearance of either male or female pedagogical agents.

=== Affective Response ===
Pedagogical agents have reached a point where they can convey and elicit emotion, but also reason about and respond to it. These agents are often designed to elicit and respond to affective actions from users through various modalities such as speech, facial expressions, and body gestures. They respond to the affective state of the given user, and make use of these modalities using a wide array of sensors incorporated into the design of the agent. Specifically in education and training applications, pedagogical agents are often designed to increasingly recognize when users or learners exhibit frustration, boredom, confusion, and states of flow. The added recognition in these agents is a step toward making them more emotionally intelligent, comforting and motivating the users as they interact.

=== Digital Representation ===
The design of a pedagogical agent often begins with its digital representation, whether it will be 2D or 3D and static or animated. Several studies have developed pedagogical agents that were both static and animated, then evaluated the relative benefits. Similar to other design considerations, the improved learning from static or animated agents remains questionable. One study showed that the appearance of an agent portrayed using a static image can impact a user's recall, based on the visual appearance. Other research found results that suggest static agent images improve learning outcomes. However, several other studies found user's learned more when the pedagogical agent was animated rather than static. Recently a meta-analysis of such research found a negligible improvement in learning via pedagogical agents, suggesting more work needs to be done in the area to support any claims.
