= Action assembly theory =

Action assembly theory is a communication theory that emphasizes psychological and social influences on human action. The goal is to examine and describe the links between the cognition and behavior – how an individual's thoughts get transformed into action. It was developed by John Greene.

== Definition ==
Action assembly theory describes the production of behavior in two essential processes:

- the retrieval of procedural elements from long-term memory, and
- the organization of these elements to form an output representation of action to be taken.

Action assembly theory seeks to explain message behavior (both verbal and nonverbal). It is a communication theory that emphasizes psychological and social influences on human action. The goal is to examine and describe the links between the cognition and behavior-how an individual's thoughts get transformed into action. According to the psychology wiki, action assembly theory describes the production of behavior in two essential processes: the retrieval of procedural elements from long-term memory, and the organization of these elements to form an output representation of action to be taken. For example, assembly is considered a top-to-bottom process that begins with more general strategy and goes to a more specific idea about communicating the specific message.

== Retrieval of procedural elements ==
The idea of procedural record is at the center of action assembly. These records contain information about action, outcomes, and situations. These records are locked in the individual's memory where it remembers past behaviors for the future.

A procedural record is at the center of action assembly. It is a personal nugget of truth about past behavior stockpiled for future use, part of an individual's memory system in which information about how to execute various behaviors is stored. Procedural records contain information about action, outcomes, and situations; for example, traveling at excessive speed (action) in a zone that specifies low speed limit (situation) can result in the issuance of a ticket (outcome).

Procedural records have different levels of strength. Some are mere scratches that barely leave a trace in the mind, while others are well-worn into long-term memory.

A central aspect of the action assembly theory is specifying the processes that link procedural records to behavioral representations. The activation process is the process used to select particular procedural records. For example, if a parent disciplined a child for stealing, all procedural records relevant to this goal and situation would be activated. In turn, if a common disciplinary tactic was to take away toys and play items, a procedural record of that would be activated quickly.

== Organization of procedural elements ==
It is also important to consider the process of assembly, which organizes records into a behavioral representation. For example, assembly is considered a top-down process that begins with general strategy and goes to more specific ideas about communicating the specific message.

Action assembly theory has been useful for topics such as speech onset latency and hesitations during speaking. These concepts are assumed to be indicators of cognitive processing. Another use is the study of planning – individuals who plan more effectively are more fluent than those do not, because planning reduces the cognitive load at the time of message production.

When an interaction situation has multiple goals, the theory finds increased demands on an individual's information processing capacity. Assembly of goals may be difficult because a specific goal may be incompatible with behaviors associated with the other goals. In turn, multiple goal messages involve more speech hesitations and latencies. The utilization of Action Assembly theory can provide a clear opportunity to plan or assemble goals more careful to mitigate the effect.

== Use ==
When an interaction situation has multiple goals, the theory finds increased demands on an individual's information processing capacity. Assembly of goals may be difficult because a specific goal may be incompatible with behaviors associated with each other goals. In turn, multiple goal messages involve more speech hesitation. The utilization of action assembly theory can provide a clear opportunity to plan or assemble goals more careful to ease the effect.
