= Example choice =

Teaching method

Example choice is a teaching method that aims to highlight the connection between formal principles of mathematics and science and their relevance for everyday life, in order to make school instruction a relevant experience for the child.

In traditional teaching, formal principles (laws, formula, problem solving procedures) in mathematics and science are often taught abstractly and then illustrated by an example. In example choice, by contrast, students are given multiple example tasks that all can be solved using the formal principle. The examples pertain to different topics, and each student is instructed to choose the most interesting example, which is then used to explain the formal principle.

The method has been developed and explored at the University of Bergen, and was called for by John Dewey in his 1899 book The School and Society. For Dewey, connecting instructional content to everyday life was the only legitimate way to make things interesting, as noted in his essay "Interest and Effort".

Example choice can be difficult to use in traditional teaching because teachers often do not know the interests of their students. Even if they know these interests, a teacher would need much time and effort to find examples. With new technologies, teachers and students can help build a database of examples that users can retrieve when the formal principle has to be learned.

== Example ==
When teaching the joint probability of two independent events, teachers often explain the abstract procedure (p_{1} * p_{2}) first and illustrate this procedure with an example (e.g., throwing a die twice). In example choice, by contrast, teachers first collect or construct examples from topics that are of potential interest to high school students, such as contracting hereditary diseases, contraception, or winning in a two-step lottery to meet one's favorite artist. After the students selected the example that interests them most, they are given a problem related to the chosen example that they have to try to solve. After the solution attempt, the principle behind the joint probability of two independent events will be explained, using the chosen example. Teachers may then use the other examples in order to deepen the understanding of joint probabilities, such as through the use of worked examples.

== Outcomes ==
A study observed that example choice increased interest in learning an abstract principle, and participants in the study invested more time to learn. In other words, students are the producers of learning.

One study by Perkins, Gratny, Adams, Finkelstein, and Wieman found that interest in physics declined during a semester-long introductory calculus-based mechanics course. Whereas 19% of the students reported increased interest in physics, 45% reported that their interest in physics decreased. When interest increased, the leading reason was that students reported to see a connection between physics and the real world.
