= Task loading =

Relationship between operator capacity and the accumulated activities that must be done

A task load indicates the degree of difficulty experienced when performing a task, and task loading describes the accumulation of tasks that are necessary to perform an operation. A light task loading can be managed by the operator with capacity to spare in case of contingencies. Task loads are primarily associated with underwater diving. They are also associated with workloads in other environments, such as aircraft cockpits and command and control stations.

In underwater diving, task loading increases the risk of failure by the diver to undertake some key basic function which would normally be routine for safety underwater. A heavy task loading may overwhelm the diver if something does not go according to plan. This is particularly a problem in scuba diving, where the breathing gas supply is limited and delays may cause decompression obligations. The same workload may be a light task loading to a skilled diver with considerable experience of all the component tasks, and heavy task loading for a diver with little experience of some of the tasks.

Excessive task loading is implicated in many diving accidents, and may be limited by adding tasks one at a time, and adequately developing the requisite skills for each before adding more. Excessive task load can be referred to as task overload and task saturation.

== Measurement ==
Task loads may be measured and compared. NASA uses six sub-scales in their task load rating procedure. Three of these relate to the demands on the subject and the other three to interactions between subject and task. Ratings contain a large personal component and may vary considerably between subjects, and over time as experience is gained.

1. Mental Demands: How much mental and perceptual effort is required;
2. Physical Demands: How much physical effort is required;
3. Temporal Demands: How much time pressure the subject feels;
4. Own Performance: Rating of how successfully the task was performed;
5. Effort: Rating of how much effort was put into the task; and
6. Frustration: Rating of how frustrating or satisfying the task was to perform.

== Common examples in scuba diving ==
Task loading is generally increased by any unplanned demand on the diver's attention, such as an emergency, an adverse change in environmental conditions, or a deviation from the dive plan. If this is added to an already marginally manageable task load, the diver may no longer be able to cope.

Common examples of activities which can contribute to high task loading are:

- underwater photography or videography
- underwater search and recovery
- underwater mapping
- diving in environments requiring use lights or guide reels (such as night diving, wreck diving and cave diving) or other additional equipment
- use of dry suits when unfamiliar
- driving a diver propulsion vehicle (DPV)
- diving in cold water has a distraction effect, which may reduce the capacity of the diver to manage complex tasks effectively
- breathing narcotic gas mixture indirectly affects task loading by reducing the capacity to manage the tasks effectively Nitrogen narcosis can distract or cause narrowing of attention, both of which can distract from other tasks.
- low visibility has a distracting effect as does low light levels
- use of a rebreather, particularly in the event of a malfunction. Manually controlling a rebreather is a higher task load than using an electronically controlled rebreather as long as the electronic control system is working correctly. If it malfunctions, the diver must manually control the unit, which is likely to be less familiar, and a higher task loading than a familiar manual control system.
- use of unfamiliar equipment, particularly combinations of several items that are unfamiliar.
- buoyancy problems - inability to establish appropriate buoyancy, particularly excessive buoyancy or severely inadequate buoyancy.
- trim problems - inability to trim as desired due to poor weight distribution

Common examples of routine functions that can be neglected as a result of task loading are:

- monitoring breathing gas supply properly
- maintaining buddy contact
- maintaining proper buoyancy (Note: This is identified in most training courses as a common failing of new underwater photographers and underwater videographers)
- monitoring depth and time to avoid no-decompression limits, or remain within planned decompression limits
- monitoring oxygen partial pressure in a rebreather
- maintaining contact with the guideline in a penetration dive

== Management ==
Task loading is often identified as a key component in diving safety and diving accidents, although statistically it is difficult to monitor because divers with more experience can cope with a more complex array of tasks and equipment. Simply controlling buoyancy while using a dry suit can call for great levels of attention in an inexperienced diver, but would be routine for an experienced cold water diver, and could be done safely while carrying a camera during a cave penetration or using a DPV.

Task loading represents an elevated risk when a new activity is undertaken by a diver. A diver learning how to use a dry suit, or starting underwater photography, or learning to operate a rebreather or manage multiple gas decompression will need to dedicate considerably more attention to the proper functioning of the new and unfamiliar piece of equipment which increases the risk of neglecting other critical responsibilities. Those risks will normally diminish with experience, provided that the experience is sufficiently concentrated and repeated to allow overlearning of skills and develop muscle memory.

== See also ==
- Cognitive load – Effort being used in the working memory
- Overlearning – Practicing newly acquired skills beyond the point of initial mastery
- Muscle memory – Consolidating a motor task into memory through repetition
