= Modality effect =

The modality effect is a term used in experimental psychology, most often in the fields dealing with memory and learning, to refer to how learner performance depends on the presentation mode of studied items.

== Description ==
Modality can refer to a number of characteristics of the presented study material. However, this term is usually used to describe the improved recall of the final items of a list when that list is presented verbally in comparison with a visual representation. The effect is seen in free recall (recall of list items in any given order), serial recall (recall of list items in the order of study), short-term sentence recall (recall specific words from sentences with similar meanings) and paired associate recall (recall of a pair from presentation of one of its members). For paired associates, the effect is limited to an increased probability of recall for the final 2 or 3 pairs studied. In free recall and serial recall, the modality effect is seen as simply an exaggerated recency effect in tests where presentation is auditory. In short-term sentence recall studies, emphasis is placed on words in a distractor-word list when requesting information from the remembered sentence. This demonstrates the modality effect can be more than auditory or visual.

For serial recall, the modality effect is seen in an increased memory span for auditorally presented lists. Memory span is defined as the maximum number of items that participants correctly recall in 50% of trials. Typically, studies find these to be seven digits, six letters and five words. In a study done by Drewnowski and Murdock, a visual list of English words was found to have an immediate recall of 4.82 words while an auditory representation of this same list led to a memory span of 5.36, a statistically significant variance.

Some studies use the term modality to refer to a general difference in performance based upon the mode of presentation. For example, Gibbons demonstrated modality effects in an experiment by making participants count either beeping sounds or visually presented dots. The to-be-remembered number was derived from the number of dots or beeps counted. In memory experiments, the modality effect is an example of source clustering, which refers to the tendency of items presented in the same modality to be grouped together during recall. Within-list manipulations of modality affect recall probability, order of recall, and grouping.

Bennet Murdock used a basic free recall paradigm, with different types of lists, mixing auditorally and visually presented words. The results he obtained showed that modality improved recency but did not affect recall for the pre-recency items. This effect was seen to be slightly larger when the items for study were presented more rapidly. However, with mixed list presentations (lists presented both auditorally and visually in a single study period) the superiority of auditory study is seen in all serial positions, not just in recency. Murdock interprets this as evidence for separate short term stores for visual and auditory memory.

Glenberg showed that the modality effect is also prevalent in long term memory, showing that to-be-remembered word pairs that are separated by distractor activity are better recalled if presented auditorally vs. visually. By using techniques similar to Murdock's free recall paradigm, plus the addition of varied amounts of distraction time (filled with counting backwards), Glenberg showed that the modality effect is not affected by a disruptive task and therefore is theoretically not restricted to short term memory.

In his book about teaching Mathematics, Craig Barton refers to the Modality Effect, arguing that students learn better when images or narrations are presented alongside verbal narration, as opposed to being presented with on screen text. This is because the text would be initially processed as an image, adding to the work already being done by the brain in processing the other image. In contrast, the narration is dealt with by the 'Phonological Loop' while the 'Visuospatial Sketchpad' deals separately with the original image and hence both pieces of information can be processed simultaneously. Teachers can hence seek to avoid overloading students' working memories by not using slides containing many images and text at the same time.

Several terms have been used to refer to the modality effect on recency. Crowder and Morton refer to it as PAS, or precategorical acoustic store. This and other similar terms (echoic memory, phonological loop) are used to explain a specialized short-term memory system store for phonological information.

== See also ==
- E-learning (theory)
- Multimedia learning
