= AutoTutor =

- Developer(s): Institute for Intelligent Systems
- Type: Intelligent tutoring system and Educational software
- Website: https://start.autotutor.org/

AutoTutor is an intelligent tutoring system developed by researchers at the Institute for Intelligent Systems at the University of Memphis, including Arthur C. Graesser that helps students learn Newtonian physics, computer literacy, and critical thinking topics through tutorial dialogue in natural language. AutoTutor differs from other popular intelligent tutoring systems such as the Cognitive Tutor, in that it focuses on natural language dialog. This means that the tutoring occurs in the form of an ongoing conversation, with human input presented using either voice or free text input. To handle this input, AutoTutor uses computational linguistics algorithms including latent semantic analysis, regular expression matching, and speech act classifiers. These complementary techniques focus on the general meaning of the input, precise phrasing or keywords, and functional purpose of the expression, respectively. In addition to natural language input, AutoTutor can also accept ad hoc events such as mouse clicks, learner emotions inferred from emotion sensors, and estimates of prior knowledge from a student model. Based on these inputs, the computer tutor (or tutors) determine when to reply and what speech acts to reply with. This process is driven by a "script" that includes a set of dialog-specific production rules.

AutoTutor simulates the discourse patterns of human tutors, based on analysis of human-to-human tutoring sessions and theoretically grounded tutoring strategies based on cognitive learning principles. It presents a series of challenging open-ended questions that require verbal explanations and reasoning in an answer. It engages in a collaborative, mixed initiative dialog while constructing the answer, a process that typically takes approximately 100 conversational turns. AutoTutor speaks the content of its turns through an animated conversational agent with a speech engine, some facial expressions, and rudimentary gestures. For some topics, there are graphical displays, animations of causal mechanisms, or interactive simulation environments. AutoTutor tracks the cognitive states of the learner by analyzing the content of the dialogue history. AutoTutor dynamically selects the words and statements in each conversational turn in a fashion that is sensitive to what the learner knows. Recent versions of the AutoTutor system also adapt to the learner's emotional states in addition to their cognitive states.

AutoTutor has shown learning gains, particularly on deep reasoning questions, in over a dozen experiments on college students for topics in introductory computer literacy and conceptual physics. Tests of AutoTutor have produced effect sizes with a mean of 0.8 (range of 0.4 to 1.5), depending on the learning measure, the comparison condition, the subject matter, and version of AutoTutor. For comparison, an effect size of 1.0 would be roughly equivalent to a full letter grade. However, the time and cost of authoring content is significantly greater than non-interactive educational materials such as slide decks or traditional textbooks, which is a common problem for intelligent tutoring systems. Methodologies to accelerate authoring of intelligent tutoring systems remain an active area in the field.
