= Richard E. Mayer =

American educational psychologist (born 1947)

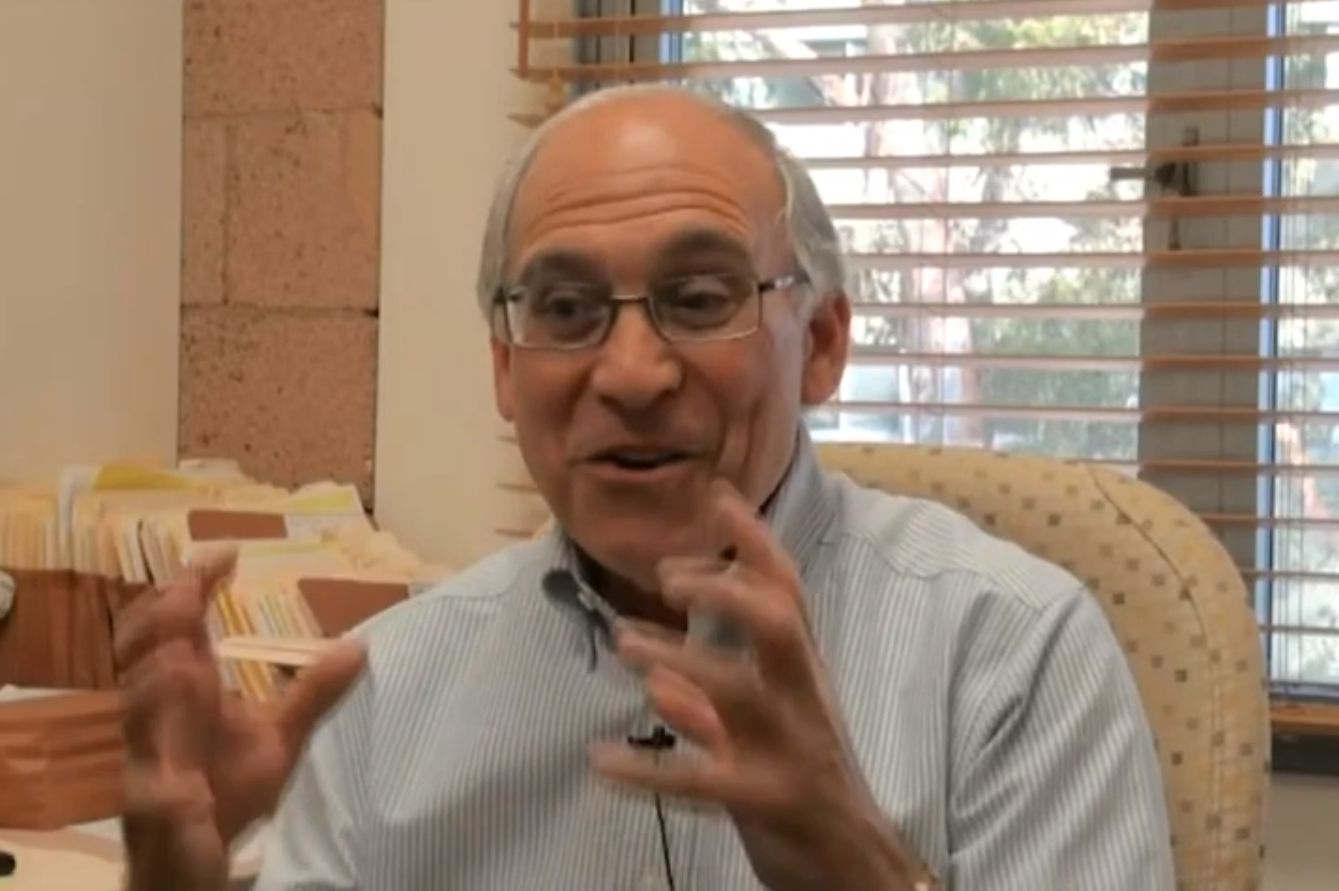
- Prof. Richard E. Mayer - On the role and design of video for learning. 2011
- Born: 1947 (age 78–79)
- Education: Miami University, University of Michigan
- Awards: E. L. Thorndike Award (2000); James McKeen Cattell Fellow Award (2018)
- Scientific career
- Fields: Psychology, Education
- Workplaces: University of California, Santa Barbara
- Doctoral students: Roxana Moreno

Richard E. Mayer (born 1947) is an American educational psychologist and Professor of Psychology at the University of California, Santa Barbara (UCSB) where he has served since 1975.

He received a PhD in psychology from the University of Michigan (1973), and served as a Visiting Assistant Professor of Psychology at Indiana University (1973–1975).

Mayer has made significant contributions to theories of cognition and learning, especially as they relate to problem solving and the design of educational multimedia. His best known contribution to the field of educational psychology is multimedia learning theory, which posits that optimal learning occurs when visual and verbal materials are presented together simultaneously.

He is the year 2000 recipient of the E. L. Thorndike Award for career achievement in educational psychology, and the winner of 2008 Distinguished Contribution of Applications of Psychology to Education and Training Award from the American Psychological Association. He was ranked #1 as the most productive educational psychologist in the world for 1997–2001.

== Writings ==
Mayer is the author of more than 390 publications including 23 books on education and multimedia. A selection:

- Multimedia Learning. New York: Cambridge University Press, 2001. ISBN 978-0-521-78749-9
- Learning and Instruction. Upper Saddle River, N.J.: Merrill, 2003 ISBN 978-0-13-098396-1
- With Clark, Ruth Colvin. E-Learning and the Science of Instruction: Proven Guidelines for Consumers and Designers of Multimedia Learning. San Francisco, CA: Jossey-Bass/Pfeiffer, 2003. ISBN 978-0-7879-6051-3
- The Cambridge Handbook of Multimedia Learning. Cambridge, U.K.: Cambridge University Press, 2005. ISBN 978-0-521-83873-3
- The Cambridge Handbook of Multimedia Learning Second Edition. Cambridge, U.K.: Cambridge University Press, 2009. ISBN 978-0-521-51412-5
