= Worked-example effect =

Aspect of cognitive load theory

The worked-example effect is a learning effect predicted by cognitive load theory. Specifically, it refers to improved learning observed when worked examples are used as part of instruction, compared to other instructional techniques such as problem-solving^{:233} and discovery learning. According to Sweller: "The worked example effect is the best known and most widely studied of the cognitive load effects".

Worked examples improve learning by reducing cognitive load during skill acquisition, and "is one of the earliest and probably the best known cognitive load reducing technique". In particular, worked examples provide instructions to reduce extraneous cognitive load and increase germane cognitive load for the learner initially when few schemas are available. Intrinsic cognitive load is a third type of cognitive load that provides a base load that is irreducible. Extraneous load is reduced by scaffolding of worked examples at the beginning of skill acquisition. Finally, worked examples can also increase germane load when prompts for self-explanations are used.

Renkl suggests that worked examples are best used in "sequences of faded examples for certain problem types in order to foster understanding in skill acquisition," and that prompts, help system, and/or training be used to facilitate the learners' self-explanations. This view is supported by experimental findings comparing a faded worked-example procedure and a well-supported problem-solving approach.

"Studying [worked examples] loses its effectiveness with increasing expertise", an effect known as the expertise reversal effect. Further limitations of the classical worked-example method include "focusing on one single correct solution and on algorithmic skill domains". Addressing such restrictions in multimedia learning environments remains an area of active research.

== Definitions ==
=== Worked example ===
"A worked example is a step-by-step demonstration of how to perform a task or how to solve a problem". Worked examples are designed to support initial acquisition of cognitive skills through introducing a formulated problem, solution steps and the final solution. Studying worked examples is an effective instructional strategy to teach complex problem-solving skills. This is because example-based instruction provides expert mental models to explain the steps of a solution for novices.

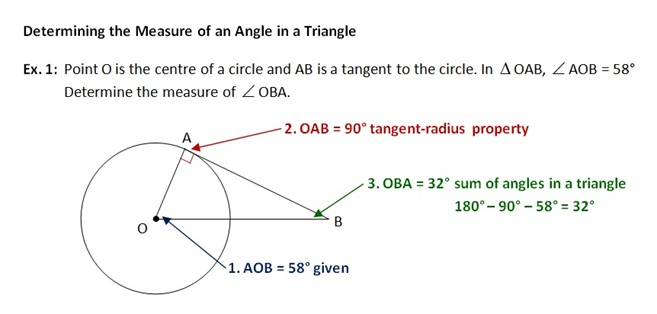
A geometry worked example using the tangent-radius property.

Worked examples, like the example above, are commonly found in mathematics or geometry textbooks, but they are also used in other fields. Worked examples had been developed for music, chess, athletics, and computer programming.

=== Faded worked examples ===
"In order to facilitate the transition from learning from worked examples in earlier stages of skill acquisition to problem solving in later stages, it is effective to successively fade out worked solution steps". Fading out steps in worked example triggers self-explanation activities, which consists of the learners' own explanations to the reasons for the given solution steps.

As learners gain expertise in the subject area of interest, worked examples lose their effectiveness due to the expertise reversal effect. Using faded worked examples addresses this effect by structuring the learners' transition from studying worked example to learning with problem-solving.

=== Self-explanations ===
According to Renkl, self-explanations are "explanations provided by learners and mainly directed to themselves. They contain information that is not directly given in the learning materials and that refer to solution steps and the reasons for them. They can also refer to structural and surface features of problems or problem types."

"Self-explanations are important and necessary" when working with worked example as "successful learners studied the examples for longer periods and explained them more actively to themselves". However, as most learners are passive and superficial self-explainers, they "should be guided to actively self-explain worked-out examples".

== Evidence for ==
The worked-example effect suggests that learning by studying worked examples is more effective than problem solving, and a number of research studies have demonstrated this effect.

Sweller and Cooper were not the first to use this form of instruction, but certainly they were the first to describe it from a cognitive load perspective. While studying problem-solving tactics, Sweller and Cooper used worked examples as a substitute for conventional problem-solving for those learning algebra. They found that learners who studied worked examples performed significantly better than learners who actively solved problems. Sweller and Cooper had developed worked examples as a means of limiting problem solving search. Importantly, Sweller and Cooper used worked-out example-problem pairs as opposed to individual worked examples. Renkl suggests learning from worked-out examples is more effective when a series is used. Pillay found that worked examples showing three intermediate problem stages were more effective than showing only one but suggested that the distance between stages needs to be small enough to allow students to connect them without having to create their own linkages.

Schwonke et al., in two experiments with Cognitive Tutors, investigated the worked example effect. In one experiment, students used Geometry Cognitive Tutor which differed by the presentation of worked examples or not. In the experiment, students that were presented with worked examples needed less learning time to obtain the procedural skill and conceptual understanding of geometry. In the second experiment, the authors aimed at avoiding the negative effects that occurred due to the lack of understanding of the purpose of worked examples, replicate the positive effects obtained in the first experiment and investigate the underlying learning approaches that explain why worked examples had greater efficiency effects. To achieve these objectives, the students were asked to think aloud, using the think aloud protocol. The results showed that the efficiency effect obtained in the first experiment was also replicated in the second experiment and the students had a deeper conceptual understanding.

Gog, Kester and Paas (2011) investigated the effectiveness of three strategies of example-based learning to problem solving on novices' cognitive load and learning, using electrical circuit troubleshooting tasks. The three strategies used are: worked example only, example-problem pairs and problem-example pairs. The results of the study showed that students in the worked example only and example-problems pair's conditions significantly outperformed students in the problem-example pair and problems solving conditions. It was also observed that higher performance was reached with significantly lower investment of mental effort during the training.

=== Expertise reversal effect ===
Although a number of research studies have shown that worked examples have positive effects on learners, Kalyuga et al. (2000, 2001) showed that the worked-example effect is related to the expertise level of a learner, referred to as expertise reversal effect. In three studies, they used worked examples in different experiments, on-screen diagrams in mechanical engineering, examples with explanatory based instruction on writing circuits for relay circuits and programming logic. In the different studies, they showed that the efficiency effect of worked examples became ineffective and often resulted in negative effects for more knowledgeable learners. However, Nievelstein et al. (2013) argues that both the worked-example effect and the expertise reversal effect that have been previously studied were based on well-structured cognitive tasks such as mechanics. In a study using less-structured task, using legal cases, Nievelstein et al. investigated worked-example effect and expertise reversal effects on both novice and advanced law students. The results of the study indicate that worked examples had efficiency effect for both the novice students and advanced law students, even though the advanced students had significantly more prior knowledge.

Another issue regarding worked examples was observed by Quilici and Mayer, who found that providing learners with three examples of each problem type, as opposed to one, did not result in any differences in students' ability to sort subsequent problems into the appropriate types. As Wise and O'Neill point out, this is not to say additional guidance will never lead to learning gains; it simply cannot be assumed it always will.

There is also some debate as to how complete the worked example needs to be. Paas found that learners in a "completion" condition, who were given a problem only halfway worked out, performed just as well on test problems as those given the problems fully worked.

== Developing effective worked examples ==
Ward and Sweller suggest that under some conditions "worked examples are no more effective, and possibly less effective, than solving problems". Thus it is important that worked examples be structured effectively, so that extraneous cognitive load does not impact learners. Chandler and Sweller suggested an important way to structure worked examples. They found that the integration of text and diagrams (within worked examples) reduces extraneous cognitive load. They referred to this single modality, attention learning effect as the split-attention effect. Tabbers, Martens, and Van Merriënboer proposed that one may prevent split-attention by presenting text as audio.

Renkl suggests that students only gain deep understanding through worked-out examples when the examples:

1. are self-explanatory,
2. provide principle-based, minimalist, and example-relation instructional explanations as help
3. show relations between different representations
4. highlight structural features that are relevant for selecting the correct solution procedure
5. isolate meaningful building blocks.

Not all worked examples are print-based as those in the Tarmizi and Sweller study. Lewis, for instance, proposed animated demonstrations are a form of worked example. Animated demonstrations are useful because this multimedia presentation combines the worked example and modality effects within a single instructional strategy.

== Audience ==
=== Novice learners ===
As it turns out, worked examples are not appropriate for all learners. Learners with prior knowledge of the subject find this form of instruction redundant, and may suffer the consequences of this redundancy. This has been described as the expertise reversal effect. It is suggested that worked examples be faded over time to be replaced with problems for practice. Thus it is important to consider the learner as well as the media while developing worked examples, else learners may not perform as expected.

Since worked-out examples include the steps toward reaching the solution, they can only be used in skill domains where algorithms can be applied (mathematics, physics, programming, etc.). For creative pursuits such as interpreting poems, or learning contexts where there is an infinite number of potential confounding factors such as conflict resolution, effective leadership, or multicultural communication, solution steps are more difficult to describe and worked-out examples may not be the most effective instructional method. The worked-out example approach is considered one of the best multimedia principles of learning mathematics. Worked examples help to direct the learner's attention to what needs to be studied as well as developing literacy skills. They serve as a guide to prepare novice learners for effective problem solving after gaining an understanding of any concept under consideration. Renkl argues that learners have a very restricted understanding of the domain when they try to solve problems without any worked examples. Thus, learners gain deep understanding of a skill domain when they receive worked-out examples at the beginning of cognitive skill acquisition. The examples give learners a clue to the right steps to solving the problem.

A 2006 piece of research found that novice learners can still have difficulty understanding concepts if given examples with incomplete or somewhat inaccurate information (known as faded examples) prior to acquiring basic domain knowledge or literacy skills in the subject matter. This is based on how a novice or expert learner structures his or her learning schemas — knowing the appropriate procedure/approach to use in retrieving and interpreting the problem. On the other hand, worked-out examples may constitute cognitive load and cause redundancy for learners with prior knowledge, in contrast with novice learners for whom worked-out examples rather serve as a compass that provides a direct guide to solving similar problems. This also applies when novice learners evaluate prototypes, which embody the main characteristics of a work, worked examples. This can also assist the novice learner with the semantic processing needed to fully comprehend a work of art or design.

The worked examples model is one of several strong cognitive-instruction techniques with great importance that help teachers foster learning. It is an application principle that significantly enhances novice learners' patterns of knowledge acquisition in the contexts of authentic problem solving. Reed and Bolstad indicate that one example may be insufficient for helping a student induce a usable idea and that the incorporation of a second example illustrating the idea, especially one that is more complex than the first, garners significant benefits for transfer performance. So, "at least add a second example" appears to be a basic rule for worked-examples instructional design. In addition, Spiro, Feltovich, Jacobson, & Coulson affirmed that providing a wide range of examples (and having students emulate examples) that illustrate multiple strategies and approaches to similar problems helps foster broad knowledge transfer and "cognitive flexibility".

The instructional model of example-based learning by Renkl and Atkinson suggests that students gain a deeper understanding of domain principles when they receive worked examples at the beginning of cognitive skill acquisition.

== See also ==
- Example choice
- Procedural memory
- Split attention effect
- Subgoal labeling
