= Split attention effect =

Learning effect inherent within some poorly designed instructional materials

The split-attention effect is a learning effect inherent within some poorly designed instructional materials. It is apparent when the same modality (e.g. visual) is used for various types of information within the same display. Users must split their attention between the materials, for example, an image and text, to understand the information being conveyed. The split-attention effect can occur physically through visual and auditory splits and temporally when time distances two pieces of information that should be connected.

== A visual example of split attention ==
Consider the graphic below from Tarmizi and Sweller. They used these graphics to compare the learning that takes place given split attention conditions. Each is a possibility of how one might arrange graphical material within a lesson. Ward and Sweller advise instructional designers to be careful when they direct a learner's attention. In several studies and experiments, Sweller and his associates found that learners had difficulty following some worked examples with diagrams separated from formulas, whereas learners using integrated diagrams were better able to process that information, and significantly improved their performance relative to their peers.

The split-attention effect is not limited to geometry. Chandler and Sweller found that this effect extends to a variety of other disciplines, due to it being a limitation in human information processing. This is the result of high visual cognitive load due to poor instructional design.

The figure on the left side of the image produces the split-attention effect, while the figure on the right enhances learning because it guides the learner's attention through the worked example. Unincorporated visual displays of information, such as the image above, can be distracting and confusing for the user, aside from producing the split-attention effect. The split-attention effect is an important form of extraneous cognitive load that instructional material designers should avoid.

== Visual split-attention ==
Chandler and Sweller found through empirical study that the integration of text and diagrams reduces cognitive load and facilitates learning. They found that the split-attention effect is evident when learners are required to split their attention between different sources of information (e.g., text and diagrams). A study done in 1979 by Egan and Schwartz revealed the importance of chunking in the recall process of symbolic images. Chunking has been proven to be a successful aid in long-term memory and image recall. Egan and Schwartz's study also suggests that chunking cannot adequately be implemented when the information and an image produce a split-attention effect.

Split attention is important evidence of the cognitive load theory as it demonstrates that the working memory load of instructional materials is important in the design of instructional materials. Chandler and Sweller also found that students viewing integrated instruction spent less time processing the materials and outperformed students in the split attention condition. Pociask and Morrison found in another study that integrated materials resulted in higher test scores and reduces extraneous cognitive load.

Deaf and hard of hearing students often experience and struggle with the visual split-attention effect. Because deaf and hard of hearing students need to focus their attention on the teacher or an interpreter, the student is forced to divide their attention between the instructor and the learning material. Deaf and hard of hearing students are most likely to have the best experience in class and ease the effects of a split attention if they have a complete view of the classroom. The split-attention effect not only affects a deaf or hard of hearing individual's schoolwork. It affects their daily life as well because visual input is their main source of communication and information about the world around them.

== Auditory split-attention ==
An auditory split-attention effect can occur when audio material and visual material result in an additional cognitive load. Moreno and Mayer found evidence for auditory split attention when they tested learners with both ambient environmental sounds and music as they learned from instructional materials. Animation is processed in a visual channel but must be converted to the auditory channel. The extraneous cognitive load imposed by music or environmental sounds were not conducive to learning.

== Spatial Contiguity Principle ==
There have been propositions to eliminate the term "split-attention effect" and replace it with "spatial contiguity". These phenomena are very similar, however, split-attention conditions do not need to be present in order for the spatial contiguity principle to take effect. The spatial contiguity principle is the idea that corresponding information is easier to learn in a multimedia format when presented close together rather than separate or farther apart.

== Redundancy Effect ==
The redundancy effect has also been linked to the split-attention effect. The redundancy effect is the idea that instruction materials that are not integrated properly produce and present information in a repetitive way, making it more likely to process unnecessary information and increase cognitive load.

== See also ==
- Cognitive load
- Multimedia learning
- Worked-example effect
- Expertise reversal effect

== Read more ==
- The Split-Attention Principle in Multimedia Learning
- The Effects of Split-Attention and Redundancy on Cognitive Load When Learning Cognitive and Psychomotor Tasks
- Flashcards
- Integration von Bild- und Textelementen (in German)
