= Gilly Salmon =

CEO Education Alchemists
- Incumbent
- Assumed office June 2020

Personal details
- Born: Southend, Essex, England, United Kingdom
- Website: www.gillysalmon.com
- Scientific career
- Fields: Higher Education; Online Learning; Education Innovation
- Institutions: University of Liverpool; University of Western Australia; Swinburne University of Technology; University of Southern Queensland; University of Leicester; Open University

Gilly Salmon is an entrepreneur and former academic specialising in digital learning. She is the founder and C.E.O of Education Alchemists Ltd - a company formed around her life's work including Carpe Diem learning design methodology, pedagogical transformation, online teaching, technology enhanced learning, the 5 stage model and e-tivities.

== Career ==
Previously, Salmon was Academic Director for Open Education Services (OES) in the UK. Previously, Professor of Innovation and Transformation, and Associate Dean, Online, at the University of Liverpool Management School. Pro Vice chancellor at the University of Western Australia, Pro Vice Chancellor (Learning Transformations) at Swinburne University of Technology, in Melbourne, Australia;Executive Director and Professor (Learning Futures) at the Australian Digital Futures Institute, University of Southern Queensland, Australia. She was previously Professor of E-learning and Learning Technologies, and Head of the Beyond Distance Research Alliance and the Media Zoo, at the University of Leicester in the UK. And before that with the UK Open University Business School. (Salmon, 2013, para. 1–4). She was a founding director of All Things in Moderation Ltd, in 2001.

Salmon has recently spoken at online conferences, including the Learnovation Tech Summit.

== Bibliography ==
Books

- Salmon, G. (2013). E-tivities: The key to active online learning (2nd ed.). London and New York: Routledge.
- Salmon, G. (2011). E-moderating: The key to teaching and learning online (3rd ed.). New York: Routledge.
- Salmon, G. and Edirisingha, P. (Eds.) (2008). Podcasting for learning in universities. Berkshire: Open University Press. www.podcastingforlearning.com
- Salmon, G., Edirisingha, P., Mobbs, M., Mobbs, R., & Dennett, C. (2008). How to Create Podcasts for Education. Society for Research into Higher Education. . *Recently published as an iPhone app.
- Jaques, D., and Salmon, G. (2008). Learning in groups: A handbook for face-to-face and online environments (4th ed.). London and New York: Routledge. www.learningingroups.com
- Salmon, G. (2000& 2004). E-moderating: The key to teaching and learning online. London and New York: Taylor and Francis. www.e-moderating.com
- Salmon, G. (2002). E-tivities: The key to active online learning. London: Kogan Page. www.e-tivities.com

Book Chapters

- Salmon, G. (2013) Information Technology and New Patterns of Teaching and Learning. The Emirates Center for Strategic Studies and Research, Information Technology and the Future of Education in the United Arab Emirates, pp. 75–91
- O’Mahony, B. & Salmon, G. (2013) The role of Massive Open Online Courses (MOOCs) in the democratisation of tourism and hospitality education, In: Ed's D. *Airey, D. Dredge and M. Gross (Eds), Elsevier Oxford, Handbook of Tourism and Hospitality Education, Routledge: London and New York
- Salmon, G. (2011) Riding the learning wave of the 21st Century, Changing Cultures in Higher Education: Moving Ahead to Future Learning, Ehlers, U. D and Schneckenberg, D. (Eds.) Springer
