= John Sweller =

Australian educational psychologist (born 1946)

- Born: Jan Schweller; 26 January 1946 (age 80); Legnica, Poland
- Citizenship: Australian
- Education: University of Adelaide (BA, PhD)
- Known for: Cognitive load
- Scientific career
- Fields: Educational psychology
- Workplaces: University of New South Wales
- Thesis: Effects of initial discrimination training on subsequent shift learning in animals and humans (1972)
- Website: www.arts.unsw.edu.au/our-people/john-sweller

John Sweller (born Jan Schweller, Legnica, Poland, 26 January 1946) is an Australian educational psychologist who is best known for formulating an influential theory of cognitive load. As of 2020 he was Professor Emeritus at the University of New South Wales.

== Education ==
Sweller was educated at the University of Adelaide where he received a Bachelor of Arts degree in 1969 followed by a PhD from the department of psychology in 1972. His doctoral research investigated effects of discrimination training on subsequent shift learning in animals.

== Career and research ==
Sweller has authored more than eighty academic publications, mainly reporting research on cognitive factors in instructional design, with specific emphasis on the instructional implications of working memory limitations and their consequences for instructional procedures. An autobiographical account of Sweller's intellectual development is available in the "Acquired Wisdom" section of Education Review.

=== Awards and honours ===
Sweller was elected a Fellow of the Academy of the Social Sciences in Australia (FASSA) in 1993.

== See also ==
- Cognitive load
- Educational psychology
- Instructional design
- Problem solving
