= Discourse Processes =

- Discipline: Linguistics, psychology
- Language: English
- Edited by: David N. Rapp

Publication details
- History: 1977-present
- Publisher: Routledge
- Frequency: Bimonthly
- Impact factor: 2.074 (2016)

Standard abbreviations
- ISO 4: Discourse Process.

Indexing
- CODEN: DIPRDG
- ISSN: 0163-853X (print); 1532-6950 (web)
- LCCN: sn79001061
- OCLC no.: 04095368

Links
- Journal homepage; Online access; Online archive

Discourse Processes is a bimonthly peer-reviewed multidisciplinary academic journal covering the study of discourse from the perspective of sociology, psychology, and other disciplines. It was founded in 1977, with Roy Freedle as the founding editor-in-chief. It is published by Routledge on behalf of the Society for Text and Discourse, of which it is the official journal. The current editor-in-chief is David N. Rapp (Northwestern University). According to the Journal Citation Reports, the journal has a 2016 impact factor of 2.074, ranking it 17th out of 58 journals in the category "Educational Psychology (social science)" and 39th out of 84 journals in the category "Experimental Psychology (social science)".
