= E-learning (theory) =

Cognitive science principles of effective multimedia learning

E-learning theory describes the cognitive science principles of effective multimedia learning using electronic educational technology.

== Applications of multimedia principles in digital learning ==
In recent applications, digital learning platforms have leveraged multimedia instructional design principles to facilitate effective online learning. A prime example includes e-learning platforms that offer users a balanced combination of visual and textual content, segmenting information and enabling user-paced learning. This approach is particularly advantageous in virtual learning environments (VLEs), where well-designed multimedia tools can replicate or even enhance traditional classroom dynamics by incorporating interactive elements, such as quizzes and visual aids, to manage cognitive load and reinforce learning. Further research continues to explore the optimal integration of these principles across diverse e-learning contexts to ensure accessibility and engagement for learners of all backgrounds and experience levels.

== Learning theories ==
Good pedagogical practice has a theory of learning at its core. However, no single best-practice e-learning standard has emerged. This may be unlikely given the range of learning preferences and teaching styles, the potential ways technology can be implemented, and how educational technology itself is changing. Various pedagogical approaches or learning theories may be considered in designing and interacting with e-learning programs.

Social-constructivist – this pedagogy is particularly well afforded by the use of discussion forums, blogs, wikis, and online collaborative activities. It is a collaborative approach that opens educational content creation to a wider group, including the students themselves. The One Laptop Per Child Foundation attempted to use a constructivist approach in its project.

Laurillard's conversational model is also particularly relevant to e-learning, and Gilly Salmon's Five-Stage Model is a pedagogical approach to the use of discussion boards.

The cognitive perspective focuses on the cognitive processes involved in learning as well as how the brain works.

The emotional perspective focuses on the emotional aspects of learning, like motivation, engagement, enjoyment, etc.

The behavioural perspective focuses on the skills and behavioural outcomes of the learning process. Role-playing and application to on-the-job settings.

The contextual perspective focuses on the environmental and social aspects which can stimulate learning. Interaction with other people, collaborative discovery, and the importance of peer support as well as pressure.

Mode neutral Convergence or promotion of 'transmodal' learning where online and classroom learners can coexist within one learning environment, thus encouraging interconnectivity and the harnessing of collective intelligence.

For many theorists, it's the interaction between student and teacher and student and student in the online environment that enhances learning (Mayes and de Freitas 2004). Pask's theory that learning occurs through conversations about a subject which in turn helps to make knowledge explicit, has an obvious application to learning within a VLE.

Salmon developed a five-stage model of e-learning and e-moderating that for some time has had a major influence where online courses and online discussion forums have been used. In her five-stage model, individual access to technology and students’ ability to use it represent the initial steps toward engagement and achievement. The second stage involves students establishing an online identity and interacting with others, with online socialization identified as a key element of the e-learning process. In the third stage, students exchange information relevant to the course, while the fourth stage emphasizes collaborative interaction among learners. The fifth stage involves students seeking benefits from the system and drawing on external resources to deepen their learning. Throughout the model, the tutor, teacher, or lecturer acts as a moderator or e-moderator, facilitating student learning.

Some criticism is now beginning to emerge. Her model does not easily transfer to other contexts (she developed it with experience from an Open University distance learning course). It ignores the variety of learning approaches that are possible within computer-mediated communication (CMC) and the range of learning available theories (Moule 2007).

=== Self-regulation ===
Self-regulated learning refers to several concepts that play major roles in learning and which have significant relevance in e-learning. explains that in order to develop self-regulation, learning courses should offer opportunities for students to practice strategies and skills by themselves. Self-regulation is also strongly related to a student's social sources, such as parents and teachers. Moreover, Steinberg (1996) found that high-achieving students usually have high-expectation parents who monitor their children closely.

In the academic environment, self-regulated learners usually set their academic goals and monitor and react themselves in the process in order to achieve their goals. Schunk argues, "Students must regulate not only their actions but also their underlying achievement-related cognitions, beliefs, intentions and effects" (p. 359). Moreover, academic self-regulation also helps students develop confidence in their ability to perform well in e-learning courses.

=== Theoretical framework ===
E-learning literature identifies an ecology of concepts from a bibliometric study were identified the most used concepts associated with the use of computers in learning contexts, e.g., computer-assisted instruction (CAI), computer-assisted learning (CAL), computer-based education (CBE), e-learning, learning management systems (LMS), self-directed learning (SDL), and massive open online courses (MOOC). All these concepts have two aspects in common: learning and computers, except the SDL concept, which derives from psychology and does not necessarily apply to computer usage. These concepts are yet to be studied in scientific research and stand in contrast to MOOCs. Nowadays, e-learning can also mean massive distribution of content and global classes for all Internet users. E-learning studies can be focused on three principal dimensions: users, technology, and services.

=== Application of learning theory (education) to e-learning (theory) ===
As alluded to at the beginning of this section, the discussion of whether to use virtual or physical learning environments is unlikely to yield an answer in the current format. First, the efficacy of the learning environment may depend on the concept being taught. Additionally, comparisons provide differences in learning theories as explanations for the differences between virtual and physical environments as a post-mortem explanation. When virtual and physical environments were designed so that the same learning theories were employed by the students, (Physical Engagement, Cognitive Load, Embodied Encoding, Embodied Schemas, and Conceptual Salience), differences in post-test performance did not lie between physical vs. virtual, but instead in how the environment was designed to support the particular learning theory.

These findings suggest that as long as virtual learning environments are well designed and able to emulate the most important aspects of the physical environment that they are intended to replicate or enhance, research that has been previously applied to physical models or environments can also be applied to virtual ones. This means that it's possible to apply a wealth of research from physical learning theory to virtual environments. These virtual learning environments – once developed – can present cost-effective solutions to learning, concerning time invested in setting up, use, and iterative use. Additionally, due to the relatively low cost, students are able to perform advanced analytical techniques without the cost of lab supplies. Many even believe that when considering the appropriate affordances of each (virtual or physical) representation, a blend that uses both can further enhance student learning.

== Teacher use of technology ==
Computing technology was not created by teachers. There has been little consultation between those who promote its use in schools and those who teach with it. Decisions to purchase technology for education are very often political decisions. Most staff using these technologies did not grow up with them. Training teachers to use computer technology did improve their confidence in its use, but there was considerable dissatisfaction with training content and style of delivery. The communication element, in particular, was highlighted as the least satisfactory part of the training, by which many teachers meant the use of a VLE and discussion forums to deliver online training (Leask 2002). Technical support for online learning, lack of access to hardware, poor monitoring of teacher progress, and a lack of support by online tutors were just some of the issues raised by the asynchronous online delivery of training (Davies 2004).

Newer generation web 2.0 services were customizable platforms for authoring and disseminating multimedia-rich e-learning courses and may not have needed information technology (IT) support.

Pedagogical theory may have application in encouraging and assessing online participation. Assessment methods for online participation have been reviewed.

== See also ==
- Computer-based mathematics education – Approach to teaching mathematics that emphasizes the use of computers
- Computers in the classroom – Use of computers in school
- Dual-coding theory – Theory of cognition
- Evidence-based learning – Paradigm of the education field
- Media psychology – Area of psychology
- Split attention effect – Learning effect inherent within some poorly designed instructional materials
- Worked-example effect – Aspect of cognitive load theory
