= Cognitive load =

Effort being used in the working memory

In cognitive psychology, cognitive load is the effort being used in the working memory. According to work conducted in the field of instructional design and pedagogy, broadly, there are three types of cognitive load:

- Intrinsic cognitive load is the effort associated with a specific topic.
- Germane cognitive load refers to the work put into creating a permanent store of knowledge (a schema).
- Extraneous cognitive load refers to the way information or tasks are presented to a learner.

However, over the years, the additivity of these types of cognitive load has been investigated and questioned. Now it is believed that they circularly influence each other.

Cognitive load theory was developed in the late 1980s out of a study of problem solving by John Sweller. Sweller argued that instructional design can be used to reduce cognitive load in learners. Much later, other researchers developed a way to measure perceived mental effort which is indicative of cognitive load. Task-invoked pupillary response is a reliable and sensitive measurement of cognitive load that is directly related to working memory. Much information, such as Declarative knowledge, may only be stored in long-term memory after first being attended to, and processed by, working memory. This was originally thought to be true for all long-term memory under the classic "gateway" model of the Atkinson–Shiffrin memory model. However, modern research has shown that some long-term memory can be encoded while bypassing, or working in parallel with, working memory. Working memory, however, is extremely limited in both capacity and duration. These limitations will, under some conditions, impede learning. Heavy cognitive load can have negative effects on task completion, and the experience of cognitive load is not the same in everyone. The elderly, students, and children experience different, and more often higher, amounts of cognitive load.

The fundamental tenet of cognitive load theory is that the quality of instructional design will be raised if greater consideration is given to the role and limitations of working memory. With increased distractions, particularly from the rise in digital technology and smartphones, students are more prone to experiencing high cognitive load, which can reduce academic success.

== Theory ==
In the late 1980s, educational psychologist John Sweller developed cognitive load theory out of a study of problem solving, in order "to provide guidelines intended to assist in the presentation of information in a manner that encourages learner activities that optimize intellectual performance". Sweller's theory employs aspects of information processing theory to emphasize the inherent limitations of concurrent working memory load on learning during instruction. It makes use of the schema as the primary unit of analysis for the design of instructional materials.

=== History ===
The history of cognitive load theory can be traced to the beginning of cognitive science in the 1950s and the work of G. A. Miller. In his classic 1956 paper "The Magical Number Seven, Plus or Minus Two" Miller was perhaps the first to suggest that human working memory capacity has inherent limits. His experimental results suggested that humans are generally able to hold only a limited amount of information in their short term memory: seven units, plus or minus two.

In 1973 Simon and Chase were the first to use the term chunk to describe how people might organize information in short-term memory. This chunking of memory components has also been described as schema construction.

In the late 1980s Sweller developed cognitive load theory (CLT) while studying problem solving. Studying learners as they solved problems, he and his associates found that learners often use a problem-solving strategy called means–ends analysis. He suggests problem solving by means–ends analysis requires a relatively large amount of cognitive processing capacity, which may not be devoted to schema construction. Sweller suggested that instructional designers should prevent this unnecessary cognitive load by designing instructional materials which do not involve problem solving. Examples of alternative instructional materials include what are known as worked examples and goal-free problems.

In the 1990s, cognitive load theory was applied in several contexts. The empirical results from these studies led to the demonstration of several learning effects: the completion-problem effect; modality effect; split-attention effect; worked-example effect; and expertise reversal effect.

== Categories ==
Cognitive load theory provides a general framework with broad implications for instructional design by focusing on the limitations of human working memory as a central constraint on learning. The primary aim of the theory is to guide the effective use of this limited cognitive resource by structuring learning conditions and instructional materials in ways that reduce extraneous cognitive load and optimize intrinsic cognitive load. By doing so, instructional designers can better direct learners' attention toward essential information and processes that support schema construction, thereby increasing germane cognitive load. Cognitive load theory distinguishes among three types of cognitive load: intrinsic, extraneous, and germane cognitive load.

=== Intrinsic ===
Intrinsic cognitive load is the inherent level of difficulty associated with a specific instructional topic. The term was first used in the early 1990s by Chandler and Sweller. Chandler and Sweller proposed that all instructions have an inherent difficulty associated with them (e.g., the calculation of 2 + 2, versus solving a differential equation). This inherent difficulty may not be altered by an instructor. However, many schemas may be broken into individual "subschemas" and taught in isolation, to be later brought back together and described as a combined whole.

=== Germane load ===
Germane load refers to the working memory resources that the learner dedicates to managing the intrinsic cognitive load associated with the essential information for learning. Unlike intrinsic load, which is directly related to the complexity of the material, germane load does not stem from the presented information but from the learner's characteristics. It does not represent an independent source of working memory load; rather, it is influenced by the relationship between intrinsic and extraneous load. If the intrinsic load is high and the extraneous load is low, the germane load will be high, as the learner can devote more resources to processing the essential material. However, if the extraneous load increases, the germane load decreases, and learning is affected because the learner must use working memory resources to deal with external elements instead of the essential content. This assumes a constant level of motivation, where all available working memory resources are focused on managing both intrinsic and extraneous cognitive load.

=== Extraneous ===
Extraneous cognitive load is generated by the manner in which information is presented to learners and is under the control of instructional designers. This load can be attributed to the design of the instructional materials. Because there is a single limited cognitive resource using resources to process the extraneous load, the number of resources available to process the intrinsic load and germane load (i.e., learning) is reduced. Thus, especially when intrinsic and/or germane load is high (i.e., when a problem is difficult), materials should be designed so as to reduce the extraneous load.

An example of extraneous cognitive load occurs when there are two possible ways to describe a square to a student. A square is a figure and should be described using a figural medium. Certainly an instructor can describe a square in a verbal medium, but it takes just a second and far less effort to see what the instructor is talking about when a learner is shown a square, rather than having one described verbally. In this instance, the efficiency of the visual medium is preferred. This is because it does not unduly load the learner with unnecessary information. This unnecessary cognitive load is described as extraneous.

Chandler and Sweller introduced the concept of extraneous cognitive load. This article was written to report the results of six experiments that they conducted to investigate this working memory load. Many of these experiments involved materials demonstrating the split attention effect. They found that the format of instructional materials either promoted or limited learning. They proposed that differences in performance were due to higher levels of the cognitive load imposed by the format of instruction. Extraneous cognitive load is a term for this unnecessary (artificially induced) cognitive load.

Extraneous cognitive load may have different components, such as the clarity of texts or interactive demands of educational software.

== Measurement ==
As of 1993 Paas and Van Merriënboer had developed a construct known as relative condition efficiency, which helps researchers measure perceived mental effort, an index of cognitive load. This construct provides a relatively simple means of comparing instructional conditions, taking into account both mental effort ratings and performance scores. Relative condition efficiency is calculated by subtracting standardized mental effort from standardized performance and dividing by the square root of two.

Paas and Van Merriënboer used relative condition efficiency to compare three instructional conditions (worked examples, completion problems, and discovery practice). They found learners who studied worked examples were the most efficient, followed by those who used the problem completion strategy. Since this early study many other researchers have used this and other constructs to measure cognitive load as it relates to learning and instruction.

The ergonomic approach seeks a quantitative neurophysiological expression of cognitive load which can be measured using common instruments, for example using the heart rate-blood pressure product (RPP) as a measure of both cognitive and physical occupational workload. They believe that it may be possible to use RPP measures to set limits on workloads and for establishing work allowance.

There is active research interest in using physiological responses to indirectly estimate cognitive load, particularly by monitoring pupil diameter, eye gaze, respiratory rate, heart rate, or other factors. While some studies have found correlations between physiological factors and cognitive load, the findings have not held outside controlled laboratory environments. Task-invoked pupillary response is one such physiological response of cognitive load on working memory, with studies finding that pupil dilation occurs with high cognitive load.

Among multidimensional subjective rating scales, the NASA Task Load Index (NASA-TLX), developed by Sandra Hart and Lowell Staveland at NASA Ames Research Center, is one of the most widely used. Respondents rate a task on six subscales (mental demand, physical demand, temporal demand, performance, effort and frustration), which can be combined into an overall workload score, either weighted using pairwise comparisons between the subscales or as an unweighted average, often called "Raw TLX". Because such scales capture perceived rather than directly observed workload, they are often combined with physiological and performance-based measures, particularly for complex tasks.

Some researchers have compared different measures of cognitive load. For example, Deleeuw and Mayer (2008) compared three commonly used measures of cognitive load and found that they responded in different ways to extraneous, intrinsic, and germane load. A 2020 study showed that there may be various demand components that together form extraneous cognitive load, but that may need to be measured using different questionnaires. Some research suggests that cognitive load theory has "Additivity hypothesis", which indicates that the three separate types of cognitive load may overlap. This would mean that cognitive load theory would need a clearer distinction between types of cognitive load.

== Particular effects ==
=== Effects of heavy cognitive load ===
A heavy cognitive load typically creates error or some kind of interference in the task at hand. A heavy cognitive load can also increase stereotyping. This is because a heavy cognitive load pushes excess information into subconscious processing, which involves the use of schemas, the patterns of thought and behavior that help to organize information into categories and identify the relationships between them. Stereotypical associations may be automatically activated by the use of pattern recognition and schemas, producing an implicit stereotype effect. Stereotyping is an extension of the fundamental attribution error, which also increases in frequency with heavier cognitive load. The notions of cognitive load and arousal contribute to the overload hypothesis explanation of social facilitation: in the presence of an audience, subjects tend to perform worse in subjectively complex tasks (whereas they tend to excel in subjectively easy tasks).

=== Effects of the Internet ===
One domain where the effect of the internet may have adverse consequences for both cognitive performance and brain health is spatial navigation. As part of their training, London taxi-drivers need to memorize and navigate through the city's complex streets, leading to structural changes in the size of a key brain region associated with memory consolidation, the hippocampus. More recent studies suggest such enlargement may provide protection against age-related dementia. As a result, an over-reliance on GPS systems in apps like Google Maps, which dispense with the need for remembering routes and spatial reasoning, may also suppress brain plasticity for spatial navigation and its beneficial health effects.

=== Effects of AI ===
A growing body of evidence suggests that artificial intelligence (AI) may have a harmful effect on human cognition. Beyond search algorithms being relied on for spatial navigation, more recent machine learning applications outsource key mental functions, such as sensing the world (for example, face recognition), moving our bodies (robotics controllers), making choices (recommendation systems), and solving problems (chatbots). In the realm of education, productive struggle requiring the use of our working and long-term memory systems among others is considered "desirable difficulty" and facilitates improved cognitive performance. Similarly, in healthcare, regularly applying skills ensures their retention and proficiency, as illustrated by a study investigating deskilling resulting in poorer surgical outcomes among physicians as a result of AI tool use, which could be reversed by discontinuing the use of the AI tool.

A study of 91 university students compared the use of ChatGPT with a conventional search engine when researching a socio-scientific issue. Students who used ChatGPT reported lower cognitive load, but their final recommendations showed weaker reasoning and justifications. However, the two groups produced recommendations with similar levels of diversity, suggesting that ChatGPT did not limit the range of perspectives considered. These findings suggest that although ChatGPT can make information gathering easier, it does not necessarily help students develop stronger reasoning skills. Reduced cognitive load does not necessarily lead to better reasoning. Although ChatGPT made information gathering easier, students did not produce higher-quality reasoning and justifications in their final recommendations.

== Sub-population studies ==
=== Individual differences ===
As of 1984 it was established, for example, that there are individual differences in processing capacities between novices and experts. Experts have more knowledge or experience with regard to a specific task which reduces the cognitive load associated with the task. Novices do not have this experience or knowledge and thus have heavier cognitive load. We also see structural differences in long-term memory as reflected in the London taxi driver studies cited above.

=== Elderly ===
The danger of heavy cognitive load is seen in the elderly population. Aging can cause declines in the efficiency of working memory which can contribute to higher cognitive load. Heavy cognitive load can disturb balance in elderly people. The relationship between heavy cognitive load and control of center of mass are heavily correlated in the elderly population. As cognitive load increases, the sway in center of mass in elderly individuals increases. A 2007 study examined the relationship between body sway and cognitive function and their relationship during multitasking and found disturbances in balance led to a decrease in performance on the cognitive task. Conversely, an increasing demand for balance can increase cognitive load.

=== College students ===
As of 2014, an increasing cognitive load for students using a laptop in school has become a concern. With the use of Facebook and other social forms of communication, adding multiple tasks jeopardizes students' performance in the classroom. When many cognitive resources are available, the probability of switching from one task to another is high and does not lead to optimal switching behavior. In a study from 2013, both students who were heavy Facebook users and students who sat nearby those who were heavy Facebook users performed poorly and resulted in lower GPA.

=== Children ===
In 2004, British psychologists, Alan Baddeley and Graham Hitch proposed that the components of working memory are in place at six years of age. They found a clear difference between adult and child knowledge. These differences were due to developmental increases in processing efficiency. Children lack general knowledge, and this is what creates increased cognitive load in children. Children in impoverished families often experience even higher cognitive load in learning environments than those in middle-class families. These children do not hear, talk, or learn about schooling concepts because their parents often do not have formal education. When it comes to learning, their lack of experience with numbers, words, and concepts increases their cognitive load.

As children grow older they develop superior basic processes and capacities. They also develop metacognition, which helps them to understand their own cognitive activities. Lastly, they gain greater content knowledge through their experiences. These elements help reduce cognitive load in children as they develop.

Gesturing is a technique children use to reduce cognitive load while speaking. By gesturing, they can free up working memory for other tasks. Pointing allows a child to use the object they are pointing at as the best representation of it, which means they do not have to hold this representation in their working memory, thereby reducing their cognitive load. Additionally, gesturing about an object that is absent reduces the difficulty of having to picture it in their mind.

=== Poverty ===
As of 2013 it has been theorized that an impoverished environment can contribute to cognitive load. Regardless of the task at hand, or the processes used in solving the task, people who experience poverty also experience higher cognitive load. A number of factors contribute to the cognitive load in people with lower socioeconomic status that are not present in middle and upper-class people.

== Embodiment and interactivity ==
Bodily activity can both be advantageous and detrimental to learning depending on how this activity is implemented. Cognitive load theorists have asked for updates that makes CLT more compatible with insights from embodied cognition research. As a result, embodied cognitive load theory has been suggested as a means to predict the usefulness of interactive features in learning environments. In this framework, the benefits of an interactive feature (such as easier cognitive processing) need to exceed its cognitive costs (such as motor coordination) in order for an embodied mode of interaction to increase learning outcomes.

== Application in driving and piloting ==
With increase in secondary tasks inside the cockpit, cognitive load estimation has become an important problem for both automotive drivers and pilots. The issue has been addressed with various features such as drowsiness detection. For automotive drivers, researchers have explored various physiological parameters like heart rate, facial expression, and ocular parameters. In aviation there are numerous simulation studies on analysing pilots' distraction and attention using various physiological parameters. For military fast jet pilots, researchers have explored air-to-ground dive attacks and recorded cardiac, EEG and ocular parameters.

== See also ==
- Educational psychology – Branch of psychology concerned with the scientific study of human learning
- Energy (psychological)
- Human factors and ergonomics
- Information overload – Decision making with too much information
- Occupational stress – Tensions related to work
- Sensory overload - A similar, but subconscious overload, due to excessive sensory information being processed by the brain
- Task-invoked pupillary response – Pupilliary dilation from cognitive effort
- Task loading – Relationship between operator capacity and the accumulated activities that must be done
