= Networked learning =

Networked learning is a process of developing and maintaining connections with people and information, and communicating in such a way so as to support one another's learning. The central term in this definition is connections. It adopts a relational stance in which learning takes place both in relation to others and in relation to learning resources. In design and practice, networked learning is intended to facilitate evolving sets of connections between learners and their interpersonal communities, knowledge contexts, and digital technologies.

Networked learning can offer educational institutions more functional efficiency, in that the curriculum can be more tightly managed centrally, or in the case of vocational learning, it can reduce costs to employers and tax payers. However, it is also argued that networked learning is too often considered within the presumption of institutionalised or educationalised learning, thereby omitting awareness of the benefits that networked learning has to informal or situated learning.

== History ==
Network and networked learning theories can be traced back into the 19th Century, when commentators were considering the social implications of networked infrastructure such as the railways and the telegraph. More recently, networked learning has its roots in the 1970s, with the likes of Ivan Illich's book, Deschooling Society, through to more recent commentary in the early 2000s, largely inspired by the Internet and social media.

=== 1970s ===
In 1971, Ivan Illich envisioned 'learning webs' as a model for people to network the learning they needed:

I will use the words "opportunity web" for "network" to designate specific ways to provide access to each of four sets of resources. "Network" is often used, unfortunately, to designate the channels reserved to material selected by others for indoctrination, instruction, and entertainment. But it can also be used for the telephone or the postal service, which are primarily accessible to individuals who want to send messages to one another. I wish we had another word to designate such reticular structures for mutual access, a word less evocative of entrapment, less degraded by current usage and more suggestive of the fact that any such arrangement includes legal, organizational, and technical aspects. Not having found such a term, I will try to redeem the one which is available, using it as a synonym of "educational web." Ivan Illich, 1971

In 1977 Christopher Alexander, Sara Ishikawa, Murray Silverstein, Max Jacobson, Ingrid Fiksdahl-King and Shlomo Angel wrote and published A Pattern Language: Towns, Buildings, Construction. In this seminal text, mostly referred to by architects, lists a "Network of Learning" as the 18th pattern, and cites Illich's earlier book as "the most penetrating analysis and proposal for an alternative framework for education." Alexander et al. go on to advise builders and town planners interested in establishing learning networks with:

"...work in piecemeal ways to decentralize the process of learning and enrich it through contact with many places and people all over the city: workshops, teachers at home or walking through the city, professionals willing to take on the young as helpers, older children teaching younger children, museums, youth groups travelling, scholarly seminars, industrial workshops, old people, and so on. Conceive of all these situations as forming the backbone of the learning process; survey all these situations, describe them, and publish them as the city's "curriculum"; then let students, children, their families and neighborhoods weave together for themselves the situations that comprise their "school" paying as they go with standard vouchers, raised by community tax. Build new educational facilities in a way which extends and enriches this network."

In the 1970s, The Institute For The Future at Menlo Park in California experimented with networked learning practices based on the Internet and computer conferencing. Soon after their reports were published two educational pioneers in the use of Internet technologies, Hiltz and Turoff, linked education directly with this pioneering work.

=== 1980s ===
In the late 1980s Dr. Charles A. Findley headed the Collaborative Networked Learning project at Digital Equipment Corporation on the East Coast of the United States. Findley's project conducted trend analysis and developed prototypes of collaborative learning environments, which became the basis for their further research and development of what they called Collaborative Networked Learning (CNL), and Collaborative Learning-Work (CLW).

=== 1990s ===
Since the development of the Internet as a significant medium for access to information and communication, the practice of networked learning has tended to focus on its use. In the first phase of the Internet its use for networked learning was restricted by low bandwidth and the emphasis was largely on written and text based interactions between people and the text based resources they referred to. This textual form of interaction was a familiar academic medium, even though there was recognition of the unique qualities hypertext emerging in the online form.

In 1991, Jean Lave and Etienne Wenger published Situated Learning: Legitimate Peripheral Participation, in which they cited numerous examples of networked learning within a wide range of settings for informal learning and within communities of practice.

In the later half of the 1990s, open, interactive, situated and networked views of learning were marginalised by educational institutions as they tended to develop or deploy content and practice through proprietary learning management systems (e.g. Blackboard Inc, WebCT), and collaborative work tools such as IBM Lotus Notes/Learning Space and Quick Place), generally following concepts around "e-learning". These systems enabled the restriction of access and the management of students for the administrative concerns of educational institutions.

Since 1998, an international Networked Learning Conference has been held biannually. The conference proceedings from all the conferences since 2002 are available via the conference web site.

CSALT, a research group at Lancaster University, UK, associated with the Networked Learning Conference series and several edited collections, defined networked learning as "learning in which information and communication technology is used to promote connections: between one learner and other learners, between learners and tutors; between a learning community and its learning resources". This definition seems to ignore historical use of the term however, where computing was not of central importance.

=== 2000s ===
In 2000, John Seely Brown and Paul Duguid released The Social Life of Information and introduced the concept of Networks of Practice (NoP's), an informal and emergent social network that supports the sharing of information between individuals clustered around a practice. Building on the work done by Jean Lave and Étienne Wenger on community of practice (CoP's), Seely Brown and Duguid argued that a network differed from a community in that the relationships among members were more informal and fluid when compared to communities. While CoP's were often localized with strong inter-personal relationships providing group cohesion, NoPs were more global with relationships that were both strong tie and weak tie relationships.

Salmon (2001) wrote "learning is built around learning communities & interaction, extending access beyond the bounds of time and space, but offering the promise of efficiency and widening access. Think of individuals as nodes on a network!"

From around 2004, the idea of networked learning had a popular resurgence, corresponding with the emergence of social media and concepts of open source, such as is covered in Yochai Benkler's 2006 book, The Wealth of Networks.

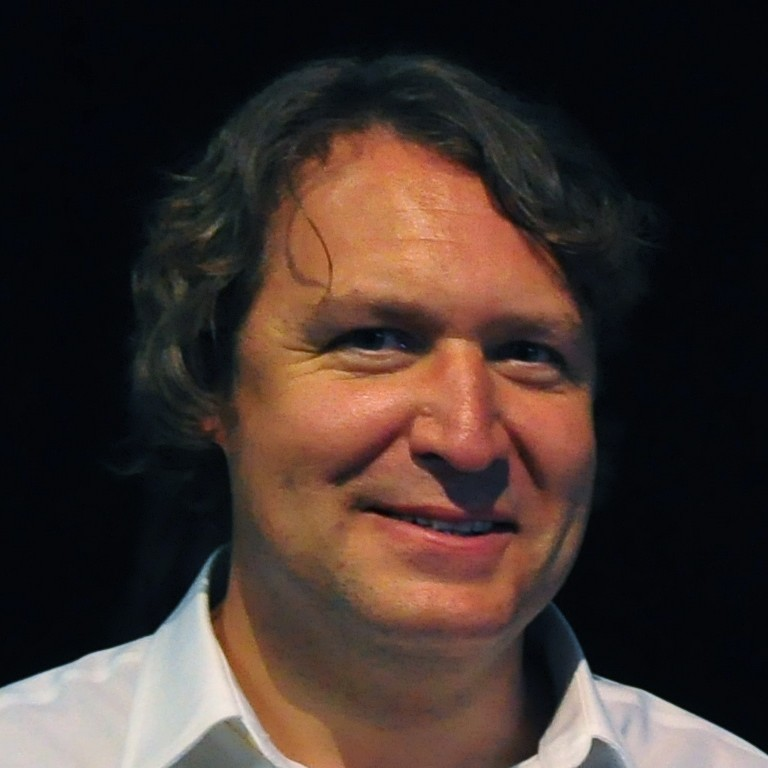
George Siemens is a theorist on learning in a digitally based society. He is the author of the article Connectivism: A Learning Theory for the Digital Age and the book Knowing Knowledge - an exploration of the impact of the changed context and characteristics of knowledge.

In 2005, George Siemens published a paper in the International Journal for Instructional Technology and Distance Learning, called Connectivism: A Learning Theory for the Digital Age in which he argued the need for a new learning theory, one that captured the essence and represented the process of networked knowledge creation and learning. In 2011, the International Review of Research in Open and Distance Learning published the first peer reviewed collection of scholarly articles on Connectivism. This special issue was edited by George Siemens (Athabasca University and Grainne Conole (Open University, UK).

In 2007, Starke-Meyerring, Duin, & Palvetzian first described Globally Networked Learning Environments (GNLE)- networked learning environments which are specifically designed to connect students from different parts of the world. GNLEs are designed to facilitate dialogue and collaboration across and within groups of students, to develop greater understanding and competencies for global work and citizenship. GNLEs take many different shapes and forms.

== Models ==
=== Connectivist MOOC ===
Success in a MOOC, by Neal Gillis and Dave Cormier

A massive open online course (MOOC) engages networked learning methods within the typical structure of a course. The first such course so named was Connectivism and Connective Knowledge 2008, hosted by Stephen Downes and George Siemens. More like an online event, MOOCs invite open online participation around a schedule or agenda, facilitated by people with reputation or expertise in the topics, relying on successful formations of learning networks to assist people studying the topics.

Earlier examples of online courses using networked learning methods:

- CyberOne: Law in the Court of Public Opinion – A 2006 course by Rebecca Nesson and co at Harvard Law School
- Introduction to Open Education – 2007 course by David Wiley.
- Composing free and open education resources – 2008 course on Wikiversity by Teemu Leinonen and Hans Põldoja of the Aalto University School of Arts, Design and Architecture.
- Facilitating Online – 2008 course established by Leigh Blackall and Bronwyn Hegarty for Otago Polytechnic, and has since run in 2009, 2010, and 2011.
- Connectivism – 2008 course run by George Siemens and Stephen Downes.
- EC&I 831: Social Media & Open Education, 2008, 2009, 2010 By Alec Couros
- CCK09: Connectivism and Connective Knowledge – 2009 by George Siemens and Stephen Downes
- DS106: Digital Storytelling – 2010/2011 by Jim Groom, took the MOOC concepts into new dimensions with people creating celebratory media for the course, and the course itself breaking course like structure.
- Globaloria – Started in 2006 by Idit Harel Caperton and World Wide Workshop as the first and largest social learning network where students develop digital literacy, STEM and Computing knowledge and global citizenship through game design.

=== Open and networked research ===
A brief animation of the core aspects of what makes research open

Some researchers have used networked learning methods to collaborate and support each other's research. The Wikiversity page for Doctor of Philosophy is supporting a small group interested in pursuing a PhD title informally. They name their practice OpenPhD or Open and Networked PhD.

== Studies ==
=== Architecture of productive learning networks ===
Academics at the CoCo Research Centre, University of Sydney, have been carrying out an extensive analysis of examples of networked learning, in collaboration with the developers and organisers of learning networks in various parts of the world. Their work has focussed on the architecture of learning networks - aiming to identify arrangements of tasks, tools and people that contribute to successful learning networks. Some conclusions from this work have been published in The architecture of productive learning networks, which also includes a chapter on the history of networked learning.

=== Situated learning ===
Some have argued that using formal education as a setting for researching networked learning misses most if not all of the value proposition of networked learning. Instead, Fox proposes situated learning and actor-network theory as the better approach for research.

== See also ==
- Asynchronous learning
- Autodidacticism
- Connectivism
- Educational technology
- Heutagogy
- Invisible College
- Personal learning environments
- Rhizomatic learning
- Social network
- Social network analysis
- Digital pedagogy
- The Wealth of Networks

== Books ==
- Blackall, L. (Ed.)(2006). The Future of Learning in a Networked World.
- Carvalho, L. & Goodyear, P. (Eds.) (2014) The architecture of productive learning networks. New York: Routledge.
- Dirckinck-Holmfeld, L., Hodgson, V., and McConnell, D. (2011) Exploring the Theory, Pedagogy and Practice of Networked Learning. New York, NY: Springer.
- Dirckinck-Holmfeld, L., Jones, C., and Lindström, B. (2009) Analysing Networked Learning Practices in Higher Education and Continuing Professional Development. Rotterdam: Sense Publishers, BV. Preview available
- Downes, S. (2007). Emerging technologies for learning.
- Goodyear, P. Banks, S. Hodgson, V. and McConnell, D. eds (2004) Advances in Research on Networked Learning. London: Kluwer Academic Publishers.
- Hodgson, V., Laat, M. de, McConnell, D., and Ryberg, T. (2014). The Design, Experience and Practice of Networked Learning. New York: Springer.
- Jones, C. (2015), Networked Learning: An educational paradigm for the age of digital networks. London: Springer.
- Koper, R. (Ed.)(2009), Learning Network Services for Professional Development. Berlin, Heidelberg: Springer.
- Steeples, C. and Jones, C. eds (2002) Networked Learning: Perspectives and Issues. London: Springer.
