= Personal learning network =

Informal learning environment

A Personal Learning Network (PLN) is an informal learning network that consists of the people a learner interacts with and derives knowledge from in a personal learning environment. In a PLN, a person makes a connection with another person with the specific intent that some type of learning will occur because of that connection.

Personal learning networks share a close association with the concept of personal learning environments. Martindale & Dowdy describe a PLE as a "manifestation of a learner’s informal learning processes via the Web".

== Aspects ==
According to the theory of connectivism developed by George Siemens (as well as Stephen Downes), the "epitome of connectivism" is that learners create connections and develop a personal network that contributes to their personal and professional development and knowledge.

The following is an excerpt from Dryden's and Vos' book on learning networks:

"For the first time in history, we know now how to store virtually all humanity's most important information and make it available, almost instantly, in almost any form, to almost anyone on earth. We also know how to do that in great new ways so that people can interact with it, and learn from it."

Specifically, the learner chooses whom to interact with in these media and how much to participate. Learners have certain goals, needs, interests, motivations and problems that are often presented to the people they include in their PLN. Moreover, the learner will collaborate and connect differently with various members. The learner will establish stronger relationships with some members and have a low level of connection with others. Not all nodes will be equal. Some of the member roles include searcher, assemblator, designer of data, innovator of subject matter, and researcher.

== Recognition of PLNs ==
The European Union Lifelong Learning Programme 2007–2013 has recognized the potential for PLNs by funding the aPLaNet project (Autonomous Personal Learning Networks for Language Teachers). The project explains the value of PLNs for the professional development of language educators.

== See also ==
- Connectivism (learning theory)
- Networked learning
