= Rhizome (disambiguation) =

A rhizome is a modified subterranean plant stem that sends out roots and shoots from its nodes.

Rhizome may also refer to:

- Rhizome (philosophy), a concept in the philosophies of Deleuze and Guattari
  - Rhizomatic learning
- Rhizome (organization), an American not-for-profit arts organization

== See also ==
- Rhizoid, protuberances that extend from the lower epidermal cells of bryophytes and algae
- Mycorrhiza, a mutual symbiotic association between a fungus and a plant
- Ryzom, a 2004 massively multiplayer online role-playing game
- Rizome, a fictional corporation in the novel Islands in the Net
