= Cognitive city =

Cognitive city is a term which expands the concept of the smart city with the aspect of cognition or refers to a virtual environment where goal-driven communities gather to share knowledge. A physical cognitive city differs from conventional cities and smart cities in the fact that it is steadily learning through constant interaction with its citizens through advanced information and communications technologies (ICTs), and that, based on this exchange of information, it becomes continuously more efficient, more sustainable and more resilient. A virtual cognitive city differs from social media platforms and project management platforms in that shared data is critical for the group's performance, and the community consists of members spanning diverse expertise, backgrounds, motivations, and geographies but with a common desire to solve large problems. The virtual cognitive city is steadily learning through constant metadata generated by activity in the user community.

== Definition ==
Cognitive cities are based on advanced ICTs which support the steady automation of daily urban processes. Additionally, learning processes are added to the underlying systems of the city which allow a system to learn from its past – meaning, the past behavior of the user – and to adapt to changes in the environment and thus to new requirements. The city learns by collecting data that has been provided by the citizens through the available ICT and by subsequently analyzing them. Both, citizens and the city, profit from this continuous interaction as well as from the ongoing learning process and they steadily develop themselves whereby also the collective intelligence within the city is increased.

== Challenges ==
Just like smart cities, cognitive cities should facilitate the response to the economic, social, ecologic, cultural and political challenges of the urban development. The focus here lies especially on problems caused by increasing population growth, demographic transition, scarcity of resources, pollution of the environment, global warming and financial uncertainties.

The most important component of all challenges of a city are the citizens themselves. Therefore, it is important to include every single inhabitant in the urban development process. This means, that by taking into account every single citizen (cf. citizen as sensors) a city can further develop itself in such a way that it can fulfill the requirements of the citizens and stay attractive for current as well as potential citizens. Only a collaboration between the city and its citizens makes a successful urban development possible.

== Interaction between citizen and city ==
Such a collaboration can take place through different paths:

Question-answering-system: As a knowledge-based system, a question-answering-system is able to give answers to questions asked in natural language. Thus, an efficient dialogue between human and system should be enabled. On the basis of the collected data (cf. big data), the city is able to see which topics the citizens engage with.

Internet of Things (IoT): The whole urban environment is equipped with sensors that make all recorded data available in the cloud (cloud computing). In this way, a permanent interaction between citizens and the technology that surrounds them is developed. The citizens thus become a part of the technological infrastructure of a city. The Web of Things uses web standards to overcome IoT-challenges.

Cloud based social feedback, crowdsourcing and predictive analytics: Developments such as cloud based social feedback, crowdsourcing and predictive analytics allow the creation of cities which actively and independently learn to build a memory, to search and also to expand that memory when new information is added to the already existing. In this way, the city acquires the ability to recognize behavioral patterns and changes, maybe even to predict them and to react to them (possibly with new solution strategies).

== The cognition of a city ==
The cognitive city pursues one main goal: improved information exchange for the development of knowledge, the so-called collective intelligence. Hereby not only individual experiences and perceptions are important but also the experiences and perceptions of others. In order to attain this goal, the city, among other things, applies cognitive computing.

== Characteristics of cognitive computing ==
The theory of connectivism implies that humans do not only learn based on their own experiences but also based on the experiences of others. Thus, the knowledge base can be continually expanded. This theory emphasizes the importance of the interaction of humans and computer systems in a city as the constant interaction between city and its citizens increases their common existing knowledge.

A further base for cognitive computing is computational thinking. The goal of computational thinking is to find solutions to complex problems (problem solving) within a city and to get an understanding of human behavior with the help of computer science. Computational thinking allows to operate on different levels of abstraction and to mechanize them through precise notation and models.

The concept of the intelligence amplification loop, another important component of cognitive computing, implies that human and computer system continually learn from each other through interaction. A "learning loop" is developed in which the knowledge of human and system is continually expanded. Thus, the collective intelligence of a city is steadily increasing. The process of the intelligence amplification loop is characterized by the emergence which refers to the spontaneous formation of new and connected insights through interaction.

Most data which can be collected in a city and from its citizens are only available in natural language, which are thus imprecise. For most of today's computer systems it is difficult (or impossible) to directly process vague inputs. The processing and analysis of the existing data is absolutely necessary. For this reason, soft computing is applied. Contrary to traditional methods of calculation, soft computing techniques allow the inclusion of values which are described in natural language. This enables a nature-based precision of imprecise information which does justice to the perceptions of human beings. This is a necessary precondition for the application of cognitive computer systems and thus for cognitive cities.

== Virtual cognitive cities ==
Virtual cognitive cities are goal-driven communities made up of members who gather in a digital medium to share knowledge, data, and tools. The virtual environment is used to facilitate collaboration among community members who—outside of a shared mission—are otherwise disparate in their expertise, backgrounds, motivations, geographies, and potentially other characteristics. Virtual environments support the identification of graph patterns among metadata created by interactions between the users and the digital medium, which can then be used to understand and improve community processes.
