= Digital pedagogy =

Use of digital technology in teducation

Image by Giselle Bordoy. A logic model for virtual course implementation.

Digital pedagogy is the study and use of contemporary digital technologies in teaching and learning. Digital pedagogy may be applied to online, hybrid, and face-to-face learning environments. Digital pedagogy also has roots in the theory of constructivism.

== History ==
Digital pedagogy has its origins in distance learning, which took the form of correspondence courses delivered by mail during the early twentieth century. In 1858 the University of London offered the first distance learning degree, known as the External Programme. Charles Dickens referred to the institution as the "peoples' university” as it allowed broader access to higher education. In the United States, educational TV programs and radio broadcasts were created by academic institutions such as the University of Louisville, with the cooperation of NBC. Telecourses saw a resurgence in the early 1970s with the spread of community colleges. These distance courses paved the way for online education, which came to prevalence during the popularization of the Internet, beginning at the end of the twentieth century

In the 1980s and 1990s, the Association for Computers and the Humanities offered workshops and conferences on teaching computers and the humanities, just as digital humanities centres were becoming widespread. In 1965, the National Endowment for the Humanities (NEH) was created. This organization was far ahead of its time. It even launched the Office of Digital Humanities. There is now an annual conference entitled the International Conference on Digital Pedagogies which takes place in a different country each year. The University of Waterloo, the University of Guelph, Brock University, Ryerson University and the University of Toronto have recently come together to develop a joint conference.

== Definition ==
A definition and circumscription of the digital pedagogy domain starts from a good knowledge of pedagogy. This is because digital pedagogy is and will remain a projection of pedagogy in the digital space. Also, the definition of digital pedagogy requires a good knowledge of the technological possibilities translated into concrete educational situations – the experience of the last years shows that only certain aspects of the use of digital technologies in education have authentic value and can add new pedagogical meanings.

A working definition for digital pedagogy is given by JISC: “We define digital pedagogy as the study of how digital technologies can be used to best effect in teaching and learning” (JISC, 2020/ 2021), a completion of an older short definition: “In simple terms, a digital pedagogy is the study of how to teach using digital technologies” (Howell, 2013). Various definitions in the specialized literature are centred (exclusively) on the practical aspect of teaching and/or learning, sometimes in relation to certain pedagogical currents or in contrast to certain aspects of “traditional” education. In analysing the praxeological and epistemological area covered by the term digital pedagogy, one can notice that it is rather a pedagogy of digitalization of education or a pedagogy for the digital age than a digital pedagogy.

Digital pedagogy is the part of pedagogy that studies the design, implementation and evaluation of educational situations comprising a significant component of digital technologies, as well as the necessary conditions for their implementation – synchronous and asynchronous interactions in virtual and mixed learning environments, learning management platforms and tools, digital educational resources, educational usage of various digital applications and tools, virtual assistants for learning and teaching, digital competences of teachers, educational policies and specific programs.

In essence, digital pedagogy deals with education – principles and legalities, characteristics, limits – and the specificity of the field is given by the distinctive note that the digital component adds to learning, teaching methods, assessment of learning, learning content, learning conditions, as well as the extent to which it contributes to their efficiency. In situations where a teaching, learning and/or assessment experience supported by digital technologies cannot be transposed into the “analogue environment” without altering its essence (the learning objectives and/or the didactic strategy), then we can speak of innovation exclusive to the field of study of digital pedagogy.

== Values and Methods ==
Digital pedagogy values:

- open education, including open educational resources;
- sharing syllabi;
- sharing teaching resources through tools such as GitHub and Creative Commons;
- self-directed interest-based student project;
- publishing using open access and open peer review.

The book Digital Pedagogy in the Humanities lists and defines words associated with digital pedagogy.

Digital Pedagogy is not only about using digital technologies for teaching and learning but rather approaching digital tools from a critical pedagogical perspective. So, it is as much about using digital tools thoughtfully as it is about deciding when not to use digital tools, and about paying attention to the impact of digital tools on learning.

Immersive technology can be used in the classroom as a form of digital pedagogy. It provides students with the ability to engage in 3D modelling and collaborative world building. Examples of 3D modelling include Matthew Nicholls' Virtual Rome and SketchUp Pro which allows users to create 3D models of historical structures.

Digital media enables experiments in collaborative learning that would not otherwise be possible, such as Looking for Whitman, which was a collaborative collection of courses among four different institutions in different geographic areas.

== Practical Application ==
Digital pedagogy looks critically at digital tools as potential means for learning and teaching. It considers digital content and space as valuable sites for information and knowledge, in addition to traditional mediums such as books or the classroom. These multimodal forms of learning allow the user to have more freedom in terms of creating meaning making activities. Digital pedagogy itself is also sensitive to the ongoing discussions and debates happening within the sphere of digital humanities, namely to its practices, principles and politics.

The experimental nature of digital pedagogy enables critical reflection on its successes and contradictions in its educative possibilities. As such, it becomes a key foray into the ongoing discussion of educational technology. For example, engagement in the philosophies of digital pedagogy has renewed discussion on the politics and ethics of technology and its implication of learning as a whole.

Acknowledging the changing nature of new media practices and interaction, digital pedagogy centres the student by designing various student-led, collaborative and project-based activities to allow students to control the pace and space of learning. It is within the digital geography where new collaborative, interactive, and participatory possibilities are introduced. Platforms, such as massive open online courses (MOOCs), now supplement the physically located classrooms. New literacy studies is also linked to the study of digital pedagogy. Each countries' political thoughts regarding digital pedagogies vary across the globe. Globalization has also made an impact on teaching and learning.

== Critical Digital Pedagogy ==
Based on theories stemming from Critical Race Theory, Feminist Theory, Liberation Theory and other philosophical approaches that address how understanding power structures is essential to the dismantling of oppression, Critical Digital Pedagogy follows the ethics of acknowledging no information, knowledge, learning or teaching is ever neutral of political meaning. Reflective dialogue is a key component of a critical consciousness-raising, a liberatory praxis attributed to Paulo Freire, in learning so that the learning process itself is a praxis of liberation. Critical Digital Pedagogy integrates a second-order, meta-level analysis as part of teaching and learning about or through the use of web-based tools, digital platforms and other forms of technology. As a method or resistance against oppression, Critical Digital Pedagogy seeks to engage individuals in collaborative practices, is inclusive of voices across social-political identities, and situates itself outside boundaries of traditional education, which is considered to be based on a banking model of teaching.

== Response/Criticism ==
=== Schools/programs that have incorporated digital pedagogy ===
==== K-12 Education ====
Digital pedagogy for K-12 education follows models such as hybrid or blended learning and online-only classes. The implementation of online-only courses in K-12 education has become more popular as budget cuts make offering higher-level courses such as AP classes less feasible, or if there is not enough student interest to warrant offering the subject. Fully online courses involve a digital teacher who has many digital students with no in-class or face-to-face time. These courses can be facilitated either within a school or made accessible to home-school or abroad students. Many virtual school options receive at least partial funding from state education initiatives and are monitored by state educational committees. Florida Virtual School is funded through the Florida Education Finance Program (FEFP), and is free to Florida residents. FLVS is governed by a board of trustees appointed by the governor, and its performance is monitored by the Commissioner of Education and reported to the State Board of Education and Legislature.

There is much debate over the efficacy of virtual school options. The consensus on blended education, where students receive face-to-face instruction from teachers and the online portions are only conducted in partial time, is largely positive. Blended learning is credited with allowing students to take some agency with the pace of learning, something that would not otherwise be available to them in a traditional classroom. It allows students to make meaningful decisions about their learning and sets a basis for lifelong self-motivation and learning. The use of new technologies in classrooms also allows students to keep pace with innovations in learning technologies, to expand the pedagogical toolset available to them, such as message-boards and videos, and to have instantaneous feedback and evaluation.

However, in fully online courses, the benefits of online learning are less clear. As reported in one study about online mathematics for grade 8 students, while more advanced students may excel in online courses, the students who need the most help may suffer disproportionately to their peers, when compared to traditional face-to-face courses. It would appear that online-only courses exacerbate difficulties for students with difficulties, while allowing more advanced students the agency desired to excel in individual learning.

Digital technology platforms (DTP) are now being implemented in numerous classrooms in order to facilitate digital learning

==== Higher Education ====
Digital pedagogy is also used at the undergraduate level in varying ways, including the use of digital tools for assignments, hybrid or fully online courses, and open/collaborative online learning.

===== Digital Mapping =====
One increasingly common tool in the undergraduate classroom is digital mapping. In digital mapping, students use visual maps made with software like ESRI and ArcGIS to aid their work. Courses are typically interactive, project focused, and designed to for students with varied levels of skills. Cartographic fundamentals are taught to students through a scaffolded curriculum that combines both theory and technical skills. Courses also familiarize students with the practical applications of new technologies such as GPS and kml scripting.

===== Online Courses =====
Digital pedagogy allows for flexibility in undergraduate study. Students with long commutes can access, read, and respond to course materials on digital devices such as phones while in transit.

Comparisons of student outcomes between online courses and face-to-face courses suggest that there is a negligible difference between the two formats. Some evidence suggests that this difference, independent of other academic and demographic variables, is as small as 0.07 grade points on a 4-point scale. However, data also indicate that students with higher GPA tend to do better in online courses, while those with lower GPAs perform worse

While most universities in the 21st century use online learning management systems to help teachers communicate with their students, receive assignments, and post grades, some schools are adopting "open pedagogy" platforms that enable students and teachers to work collaboratively on course content and display their work to the public if they wish.

Two examples of open pedagogy platforms are the City University of New York's CUNY Commons and the Open Lab, a similar platform used by the New York City College of Technology. Whereas in a traditional learning management system, the teacher retains all control over the content of the course and student work is only visible to the student and the teacher, the CUNY Commons and the Open Lab enable students to post to the course sites themselves, read each other's work, and visit other classes’ course sites to learn and benefit from course materials without enrolling in the class.

===== The City University of New York =====
The Graduate Center of the City University of New York has made a commitment to featuring digital initiatives across its educational programs and public programming. Recent initiatives include the MA Program in Digital Humanities, the MA program in Data Analysis and Visualization and the Certificate Program in Interactive Technology and Pedagogy. The CUNY Center for Digital Scholarship and Data Visualization is forthcoming in the spring of 2020.

==== Graduate Programs in Digital Humanities & Pedagogy ====
According to research published in the Journal of Interactive Technology & Pedagogy, the number of graduate programs in digital pedagogy and related fields has steadily increased since 2008, especially in Australia, Canada, Europe and the United States.

== See also ==
- Digital humanities
- Virtual Academies
- Blended Learning
- Massive Open Online Courses (MOOCs)
- Distance Education
- Online classes
- E-learning
- List of virtual schools
- History of virtual learning environments
- Information and communication technologies in education
