= Karen Head =

American poet, educator, and editor (born 1967)

- Born: Karen Judy Head; 1967 (age 58–59); United States
- Occupations: Poet, educator, editor
- Writing career
- Period: 2003–present
- Website: karenhead.gatech.edu/index.html

Karen Head is an American poet, educator and editor. She is a professor at the Georgia Institute of Technology where she is the executive director of the Communication Center. Head is known for her contributions to Massive Open Online Courses (MOOCs)

Head is also the editor of the international poetry journal, Atlanta Review. In April 2018, the Waffle House Foundation funded Head's poetry tour project for under-served Georgia high school students. Additionally, Head was declared Waffle House Poet Laureate. In 2020, she was named the inaugural Poet Laureate of Fulton County, Georgia.

== Works ==
=== Books ===
- Mother Mary Comes to Me: A Pop Culture Poetry Anthology (Madville Publishing, 2020, ISBN 978-1948692427)
- Lost on Purpose (Iris Press, 2019, ISBN 978-1604542554)
- Disrupt This!: MOOCs and the Promises of Technology (University Press of New England, 2017, ISBN 978-1512600506)
- On Occasion: Four Poets, One Year (Poetry Atlanta Press, 2014, ISBN 978-1304881267)
- Teaching as a Human Experience: An Anthology of Contemporary Poems (Cambridge Scholars Publishing, 2015, ISBN 978-1443876551)
- Sassing (WordTech Communications, 2009, ISBN 978-1934999592)
- My Paris Year (All Nations Press, 2009, ISBN 1-55245-154-2)
- Shadow Boxes: Poems and Prose Poems (All Nations Press, 2003, ISBN 978-0972511025)
