= XBlock =

- Initial release: March 14, 2013
- Stable release: 5.2.0 / 10 April 2025; 3 months ago
- Repository: github.com/edX/XBlock
- Written in: Python
- Available in: English
- Type: Course management system
- License: Apache 2.0
- Website: edx.readthedocs.io/projects/xblock-tutorial/en/latest/overview/introduction.html

XBlock is the SDK for the edX MOOC platform, written in Python, and announced and released publicly on March 14, 2013. It aims to enable the global software development community to participate in the construction of the edX educational platform and the next generation of online and blended courses.
