= Pacific Open Learning Health Net =

Non-profit distance education project

- Website type: Elearning
- Available in: English
- Founded: World Health Organization
- Country of origin: Fiji
- Services: Elearning Services
- Website: POLHN Website
- Commercial: No
- Registration: Required
- Users: more than 110,000
- Launched: 2003
- Current status: Active
- Content license: Copyright of POLHN, World Health Organization

Pacific Open Learning Health Net (POLHN /ˈpɒlhən/) is a non-profit established in 2003, focused on distance education for health professionals working in the Pacific. Since 2004, it has provided free online courses for continuing professional development in a wide range of health and science related disciplines. These include self-directed, blended learning, instructor-led and hybrid courses.

The platform runs on a free and open-source software learning management system. POLHN works with several universities institutions and Ministries of Health to develop online health related courses guided by WHO publications and accepted standard operating procedure. Since 2013, the platform has resembled a typical massive open online course (MOOC) platform.

== History ==
The World Health Organization (WHO) and Pacific Ministries of Health established POLHN in 2003 through funding provided by the Government of Japan. POLHN was established to address the need of health professionals in the Pacific to access continuing professional development (CPD) opportunities and up-to-date health information. POLHN fulfills these needs through an e-learning network across fourteen Pacific Island Countries, areas and territories.

== Overview ==
POLHN provides access to sponsored and self-paced courses, news, application forms, and links to resources. The website is the main gateway to accessing courses, online resources, and health information. The website also contains information about POLHN, information on learning centres, contact details for POLHN country coordinators, information on the availability of scholarships, and application forms for courses.

It has partnerships with many organisations, allowing members to complete certification programs. There are also general courses unrelated to any certification program, such as Patient Safety, Risk Communications, Diabetes, and Psycho-social Response in Humanitarian Disasters. These take between 20 and 60 hours to complete, with automatic assessment of activities and exams.

Since its inception, POLHN has undergone various steps to expand and improve. These have included external reviews, for instance by the WHO Collaborating Centre at the University of Technology Sydney and Hezel Associates.

=== Goals ===
POLHN has three main goals:

1. To provide access to quality, equitable, efficient and effective e-learning platforms that support health workers to maintain relevant skills and in so doing to enable countries to have a more sustainable and responsive skill mix;
2. To assist regulatory and ministerial bodies to develop relevant policies for continuing professional development (CPD) of health workforces; and
3. To support in building and sustaining the capacity of institutions to provide appropriate and accredited curricula through collaborative partnerships with health professionals, service providers, professional bodies, healthcare organisations, education and research entities.

== The POLHN community ==
The POLHN platform facilitates learning through an interactive environment, where students can access information, communicate with students and teachers, and complete course modules and assessments. Over 30,000 health workers have accessed POLHN across various cadres.

=== Learning centres ===
A key component of the POLHN community is its learning centres. These are physical locations where health workers in Pacific island countries can have easy access to courses. To date, POLHN has 54 internet connected learning and development centres in 15 Pacific island countries.

Learning centres are located in 14 countries:

- American Samoa;
- Cook Islands;
- Federated States of Micronesia;
- Fiji;
- Guam
- Kiribati;
- Marshall Islands;
- Nauru;
- Niue;
- Palau;
- Samoa;
- Solomon Islands;
- Tonga;
- Tuvalu; and
- Vanuatu.

Pacific Ministries of Health have appointed 40+ country coordinators and focal points to manage POLHN in-country activities.

=== Online media ===
==== Social media ====
POLHN also has a strong community across social media. It regularly and actively engages through platforms such as Facebook and LinkedIn. These are managed in-house at the WHO Division of Technical Support in Suva, Fiji.

==== The POLHN blog ====
In 2017, POLHN launched its online blog. Since then, several pieces have been published under the general theme of health education. This has included success stories on POLHN students across the Pacific, as well as the latest news on POLHN.

==== POLHN newsletter ====
In addition to this, POLHN has a popular newsletter, which is sent out regularly to students and staff regarding all the current events related to POLHN, such as scholarship opportunities, new blog articles, and the latest courses. The blog also offers the opportunity for members of the POLHN community to write their own articles and post comments.

== Partnership approach ==
POLHN is a partnership between WHO and Pacific Ministries of Health. POLHN works with regional academic institutions; course providers; academic institutions and development partners to develops and provides continuing education opportunities to health professionals in the Pacific. POLHN hosts different course categories:

- Self-paced;
- Instructor-led;
- Blended: work-based learning;
- Mentor-based teaching; and
- Face-to-face on-site workshops.

=== Sponsorship ===
Each semester, POLHN sponsors approximately 100 staff from Pacific ministries of health to take instructor-led postgraduate courses. Postgraduate certificates, diplomas and masters programmes are all available. These can be completed without students leaving their communities.

Primarily, POLHN's partnership approach involves POLHN's partners offering sponsorship are:

- Fiji National University;
- University of Fiji;
- Pacific Paramedical Training Centre; and
- Penn Foster Dental School.

=== Self-paced courses ===
POLHN's self-paced courses are also put together with the assistance of its partners. Some courses are created in-house at the WHO Secretariat in Suva, Fiji. Others are made in cooperation with partner institutions, including the University of Queensland.

== List of partners ==
=== University of Fiji ===
POLHN sponsors registered nurses in the Pacific to undertake a Bachelor of Nursing Bridging programme at the University of Fiji (also known as UniFiji). This allows nurses with a Diploma in Nursing to upgrade their qualification to a bachelor's degree. This initiative has had positive reception in the media of Fiji, where POLHN sponsorship for nursing at UniFiji is seen as an opportunity to improve the skills of nurses in the Pacific.

=== Fiji National University (FNU) ===
POLHN annually sponsors over 100 health professionals across the Pacific to take postgraduate courses in public health and health services management through FNU. Programs are available at postgraduate certificate, diploma and masters levels and can be completed by health workers without leaving their communities.

POLHN sponsors certificates in applied epidemiology, health research, health service management, and public health. The Master's in Public Health is particularly popular.

=== Pacific Paramedical Training Centre (PPTC) ===
The PPTC provides technical training and development assistance to clinical laboratories and blood transfusion services of the Pacific region. Mostly runs training courses in Wellington but retains flexibility to run in-country courses, short-term attachments to NZ medical labs and offers on-line courses through POLHN. They also have a quality management component (Regional External Quality Assurance Programme). POLHN sponsors around 40 laboratory technicians to take PPTC's Diploma in Medical Laboratory Science. POLHN and PPTC work is benefiting laboratory assistants across the Pacific in completion of their Diplomas in Medical Laboratory Science. These diplomas include generally involve up to 8 courses over 2 years, include ones in laboratory technology, biochemistry, blood bank technology, hematology, immunology, microbiology, and laboratory diagnosis of STIs.

=== Penn Foster Dental School ===
Certification awarded by Penn Foster Career School in collaboration with Pacific Basin Dental Association (PBDA) and WHO/POLHN. This involves 9 modules in 9 months (self-paced), with face-to-face validation of skills via PBDA.

As of 2016, the countries involved are American Samoa, Federated States of Micronesia (FSM), Republic of Marshall Islands

=== Lippincott: The Online Nursing Center ===
Lippincott provides over 1000 continuing education resources developed by nurses for nurses, POLHN assists by providing free access to fee-based courses.

=== Medscape (education) ===
Medscape education provides CPD courses in over 30 health specialities. The courses are accredited by the Accreditation Council for Continuing Medical Education.

=== Global Health eLearning Center (GHeL) ===
POLHN links with GHeL in order for health professionals in the Pacific to access over 50 short courses in public health, developed by USAID specifically for health professionals working in low-resource settings. In the Pacific region, through endorsement from the Pacific Open Learning Health Net (POLHN), GHeL courses are accepted CPD requirements for 30,000 health workers from 15 Pacific island countries.

=== Secretariat at the WHO Pacific Division ===
POLHN has developed a conventional relationship with fourteen of the twenty two Pacific countries and areas and has established forty POLHN centres in 14 of those countries. The POLHN centres are usually located in or near hospitals or nursing schools. Most of the learning centres are equipped with internet connected computers, printers, scanners and video projection equipment.
