= Atlanta Review =

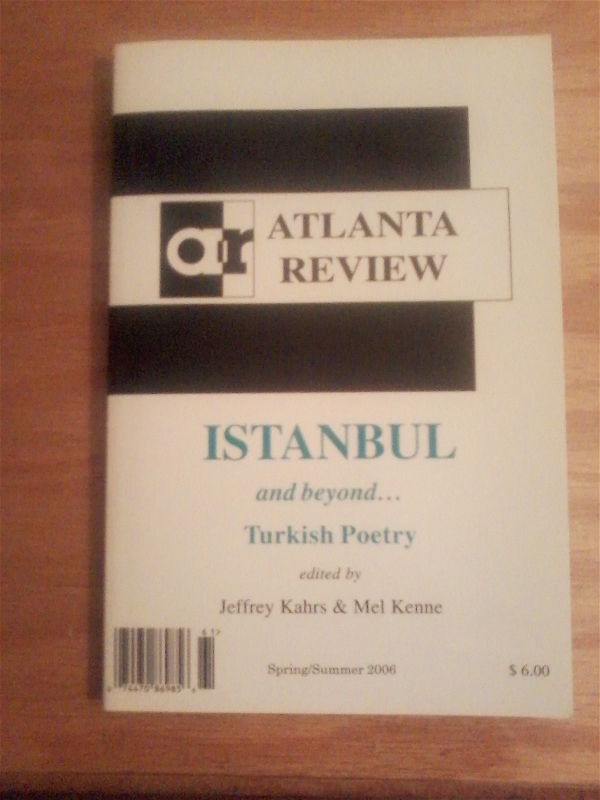
- Spring/Summer 2006 issue
- Editor: Karen Head
- Former editors: Daniel Veach
- Frequency: Semiannual
- Format: Print
- Founder: Daniel Veach
- Founded: 1994; 31 years ago
- Country: United States
- Based in: Atlanta, Georgia, U.S.
- Language: English
- Website: http://atlantareview.com/
- ISSN: 1073-9696
- OCLC: 869692966

Atlanta Review is an international poetry journal based in Atlanta, Georgia, United States. It was founded by Daniel Veach in 1994 and is published twice a year. Karen Head of the Georgia Institute of Technology became editor in 2016.

The journal's focus is poetry, but interviews and black-and-white artwork are occasionally accepted. Nobel Laureates, American Poets Laureate, and Pulitzer Prize winners are among the many notable poets whose work has appeared in Atlanta Review, including Joseph Brodsky, Billy Collins, Carl Dennis, Stephen Dunn, Gunter Grass, Rachel Hadas, Seamus Heaney, Josephine Jacobsen, Yusef Komunyakaa, Ted Kooser, Thomas Lux, Eugenio Montale, Paul Muldoon, Natasha Trethewey, Maxine Kumin, Charles Simic, Louis Simpson, Tracy K. Smith, Alicia Stallings, Mark Strand, Derek Walcott, and Charles Wright. Works first published in Atlanta Review have been included in the Best American Poetry and Pushcart Prize anthologies.
