= Small private online course =

A Small Private Online Course (SPOC) refers to a version of a MOOC (Massive Open Online Course) used locally with on-campus students. University of California Berkeley Professor Armando Fox coined the word in 2013 to refer to a localized instance of a MOOC course that was in use in a business-to-business context. In this regard SPOCs are focused on certain groups of students, which are qualified to take the course and ready to interact with others throughout the learning process. Even though most institutions do not yet award formal recognition of SPOCs, Robert Lue, who runs HarvardX, the university’s digital arm, says that it is becoming more likely that prestigious universities begin to create SPOCs for course-credits.

== Use in blended/flipped classroom learning ==
SPOCs support blended learning and flipped classroom learning, which variously combine online resources and technology with personal engagement between faculty and students. Early research results point to improved learning and student outcomes using such approaches.

In spring 2013, edX and MITx piloted two blended classroom implementations of 6.00x, Introduction to Computer Science and Programing at Bunker Hill and Mass Bay Community Colleges. The program was funded as part of a Bill and Melinda Gates Foundation grant. Students enrolled in the pilot courses completed the same exams as the 6.00x MOOC students, and scored an average of 10 points higher than their MOOC peers.

When a SPOC is implemented at an institution, in concert with students, faculty determines which features and course content to utilize. This can include video lectures, assessments (with immediate feedback), interactive labs (with immediate feedback) and discussion forums used in MOOCs. Using MOOC technology allows the faculty to organize their time with students in different ways, such as allowing more time in class for project-based work instead of grading assignments or preparing lectures. SPOCs have been analogized to “next generation textbooks,” by allowing faculty to decide how to use some or all parts of the SPOC. In a SPOC as in a MOOC students typically access interactive content at their own pace. Instructors set their own grading scale.

Colleges and universities can create SPOCs, or license them. In the latter instance, a SPOC might give the instructor an opportunity to deliver the material directly to students using video delivered by another expert, instead of assigning an article to read. Harvard University announced SPOCs for its curriculum in the fall of 2013. Unlike MOOCs, SPOCs have limited enrollment and are often used as part of a course for credit.
