= Rhizomatic learning =

Post-structural pedagogical practices

Rhizomatic learning is a variety of pedagogical practices informed by the work of Gilles Deleuze and Félix Guattari. Explored initially as an application of post-structural thought to education, it has more recently been identified as methodology for net-enabled education. In contrast to goal-directed and hierarchical theories of learning, it posits that learning is most effective when it allows participants to react to evolving circumstances, preserving lines of flight that allow a fluid and continually evolving redefinition of the task at hand. In such a structure, "the community is the curriculum", subverting traditional notions of instructional design where objectives pre-exist student involvement.

== Rhizome ==
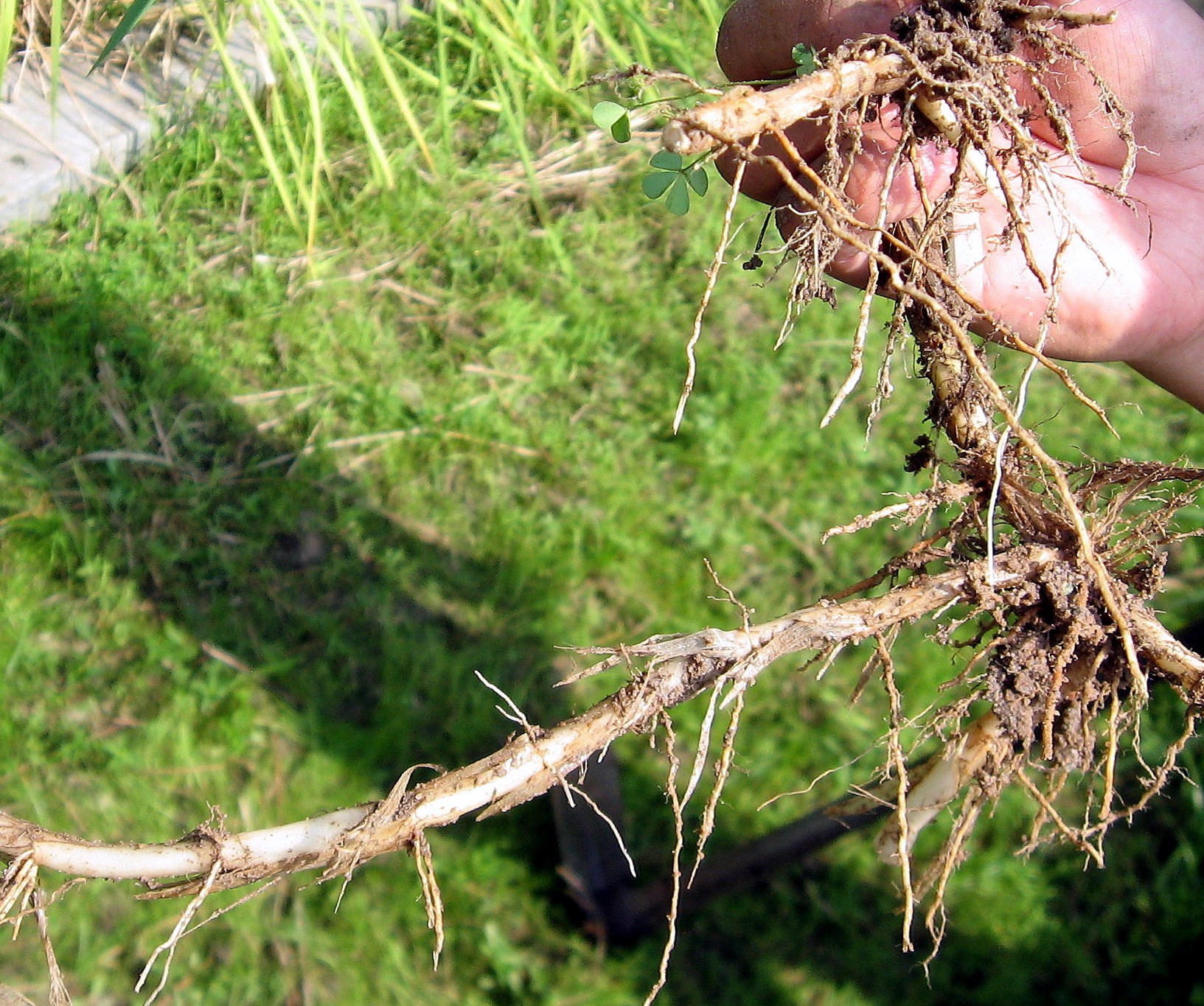
Rhizomes grow as networks of roots with no explicit center.

Rhizomatic learning takes its name from the rhizome, a type of plant stem which Deleuze and Guattari believed provided an interesting contrast with rooted plants. In her work Deleuze, Education, and Becoming, Inna Semetsky summarizes the pertinent differences of the rhizome:

The underground sprout of a rhizome does not have a traditional root. There is a stem there, the oldest part of which dies off while simultaneously rejuvenating itself at the tip. The rhizome’s renewal of itself proceeds autopoietically: the new relations generated via rhizomatic connections are not copies, but each and every time a new map, a cartography. A rhizome does not consist of units, but of dimensions and directions.

For Deleuze and Guattari the rhizome formed a model for an epistemological alternative to Western rationalism.

== History as a critical pedagogy ==
Connections have been made between the rhizomatic method and John Dewey's work at least since Richard Rorty remarked that Dewey was "waiting at the end of the road which ... Foucault and Deleuze are currently traveling." Dewey himself remarked early in his career on the contrast between the organic and non-hierarchical nature of learning outside and inside the classroom. According to Dewey, learning in agrarian culture was structured conversationally, driven by student interest, and featured many links but little hierarchy: "There are certain points of interest and value to him in the conversation carried on: statements are made, inquiries arise, topics are discussed, and the child continually learns."

In the 1990s feminist scholars such as Mary Leach and Megan Boler began examining the application of Deleuzean thought to feminist pedagogy, particularly in the teaching of history and literature. Other critical pedagogy theorists soon engaged with the concept. Roy Kaustuv described the rhizoid structure of curriculum, and its potential to free students from the linearity associated with much educational structure. Juha Suoranta and Tere Vadén, writing in 2007 about the pedagogical implications of "wikiworld" note:

The division between a hierarchical tree-like democracy or organization and that of the rhizomeian democracy or organization not only has political implications in the ideas of "leaderless revolution" and networked dissidence but also educational implications in how to organize curricula ... In this situation, teaching cannot be easily seen as an authoritarian activity but more like "subversive activity" (Postman & Weingartner, 1971) in which teachers, along with their students, compare information from various sources, negotiate their knowledge and experiences together, and interpret the world."

== Application to net-enabled learning ==
In addition to its association with critical pedagogy, rhizomatic learning has seen a resurgence of interest based on its connection to emergent online learning practices such as MOOCs.

== Criticism ==
Educational researcher Terry Anderson has criticized the way in which advocates of rhizomatic learning seem to attack the idea of formal education as a whole.

George Siemens, one of the inventors of massive open online courses, has questioned the usefulness of the rhizomatic metaphor when compared to traditional network analysis:

I don’t see rhizomes as possessing a similar capacity (to networks) to generate insight into learning, innovation, and complexity ... Rhizomes then, are effective for describing the structure and form of knowledge and learning ... [h]owever, beyond the value of describing the form of curriculum as decentralized, adaptive, and organic, I'm unsure what rhizomes contribute to knowledge and learning.
