= Stephen Downes =

Canadian philosopher and commentator

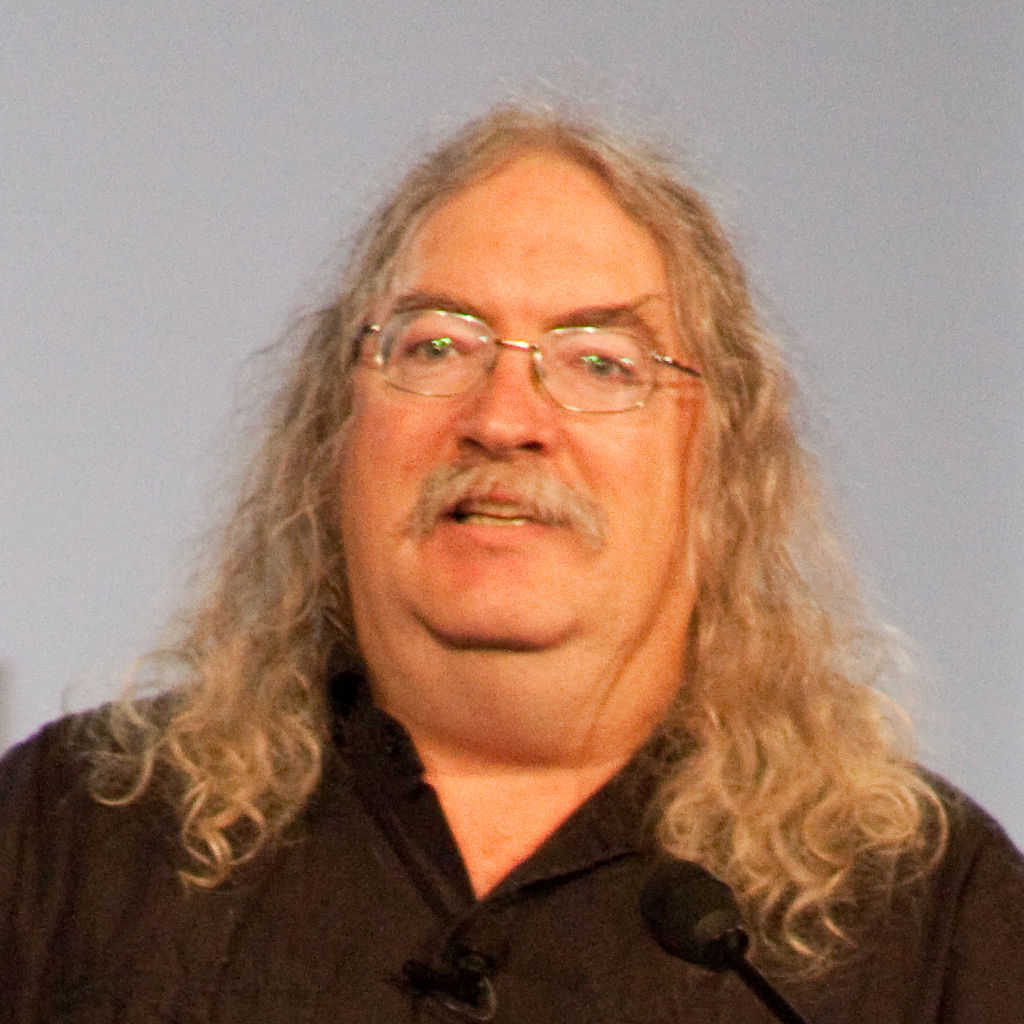
- Downes in 2009
- Born: April 6, 1959 (age 67); Montreal, Quebec, Canada
- Education: University of Calgary (BA, MA); University of Alberta (PhD)
- Occupations: Philosopher; commentator

Stephen Downes (born April 6, 1959) is a Canadian philosopher and commentator in the fields of online learning and new media. He has explored and promoted the educational use of computer and online technologies since 1995. He gave the 2004 Buntine Oration and was a presenter at the February 2007 Online Connectivism Conference. In 2008, Downes and George Siemens designed and taught an online, open course reported as a "landmark in the small but growing push toward 'open teaching'" - widely considered the first massive open online course (MOOC).

Born in Montreal, Quebec, Downes lived and worked across Canada before joining the National Research Council of Canada as a senior researcher in November 2001. Currently, he is a researcher at the NRC's Digital Technologies Research Centre in Ottawa.

Downes was the winner of the Edublog Award for Best Individual Blog in 2005 for his blog OLDaily. He is Editor at Large of the International Journal of Instructional Technology and Distance Learning.

Downes ran for Mayor of Brandon in 1995, when he was working at the Assiniboine Community College. A member of the New Democratic Party, he ran on a platform to the left of incumbent mayor Rick Borotsik.
