= Connectivism =

Theory of learning in a digital age

Connectivism is a theoretical framework for understanding learning in a digital age. It emphasizes how internet technologies such as web browsers, search engines, wikis, online discussion forums, and social networks contributed to new avenues of learning. Technologies have enabled people to learn and share information across the World Wide Web and among themselves in ways that were not possible before the digital age. Learning does not simply happen within an individual, but within and across the networks.

What sets connectivism apart from theories such as constructivism is the view that "learning (defined as actionable knowledge) can reside outside of ourselves (within an organization or a database), is focused on connecting specialized information sets, and the connections that enable us to learn more are more important than our current state of knowing". Connectivism sees knowledge as a network and learning as a process of pattern recognition. Connectivism has similarities with Vygotsky's zone of proximal development (ZPD) and Engeström's activity theory. The phrase "a learning theory for the digital age" indicates the emphasis that connectivism gives to technology's effect on how people live, communicate, and learn. Connectivism is an integration of principles related to chaos, network, complexity, and self-organization theories.

== History ==
Connectivism was first introduced in 2004 on a blog post which was later published as an article in 2005 by George Siemens. It was later expanded in 2005 by two publications, Siemens' Connectivism: Learning as Network Creation and Stephen Downes' An Introduction to Connective Knowledge. Both works received significant attention in the blogosphere and an extended discourse has followed on the appropriateness of connectivism as a learning theory for the digital age. In 2007, Bill Kerr entered into the debate with a series of lectures and talks on the matter, as did Forster, both at the Online Connectivism Conference at the University of Manitoba. In 2008, in the context of digital and e-learning, connectivism was reconsidered and its technological implications were discussed by Siemens' and Ally.

== Nodes and links ==
The central aspect of connectivism is the metaphor of a network with nodes and connections. In this metaphor, a node is anything that can be connected to another node such as an organization, information, data, feelings, and images. Connectivism recognizes three node types: neural, conceptual (internal) and external. Connectivism sees learning as the process of creating connections and expanding or increasing network complexity. Connections may have different directions and strengths. In this sense, a connection joining nodes A and B which goes from A to B is not the same as one that goes from B to A. There are some special kinds of connections such as "self-join" and pattern. A self-join connection joins a node to itself and a pattern can be defined as "a set of connections appearing together as a single whole".

The idea of organisation as cognitive systems where knowledge is distributed across nodes originated from the Perceptron (Artificial neuron) in an Artificial Neural Network, and is directly borrowed from Connectionism, "a software structure developed based on concepts inspired by biological functions of brain; it aims at creating machines able to learn like human".

The network metaphor allows a notion of "know-where" (the understanding of where to find the knowledge when it is needed) to supplement to the ones of "know-how" and "know-what" that make the cornerstones of many theories of learning.

As Downes states: "at its heart, connectivism is the thesis that knowledge is distributed across a network of connections, and therefore that learning consists of the ability to construct and traverse those networks".

=== Principles ===
Principles of connectivism include:

- Learning and knowledge rests in diversity of opinions.
- Learning is a process of connecting specialized nodes or information sources.
- Learning may reside in non-human appliances.
- Learning is more critical than knowing.
- Maintaining and nurturing connections is needed to facilitate continuous learning. When the interaction time between the actors of a learning environment is not enough, the learning networks cannot be consolidated.
- Perceiving connections between fields, ideas and concepts is a core skill.
- Currency (accurate, up-to-date knowledge) is the intent of learning activities.
- Decision-making is itself a learning process. Choosing what to learn and the meaning of incoming information is seen through the lens of a shifting reality. While there is a right answer now, it may be wrong tomorrow due to alterations in the information climate affecting the decision.

== Teaching methods ==
Summarizing connectivist teaching and learning, Downes states: "to teach is to model and demonstrate, to learn is to practice and reflect."

In 2008, Siemens and Downes delivered an online course called "Connectivism and Connective Knowledge". It covered connectivism as content while attempting to implement some of their ideas. The course was free to anyone who wished to participate, and over 2000 people worldwide enrolled. The phrase "Massive Open Online Course" (MOOC) describes this model. All course content was available through RSS feeds, and learners could participate with their choice of tools: threaded discussions in Moodle, blog posts, Second Life and synchronous online meetings. The course was repeated in 2009 and in 2011.

At its core, connectivism is a form of experiential learning which prioritizes the set of formed by actions and experience over the idea that knowledge is propositional.

== Criticisms ==
The idea that connectivism is a new theory of learning is not widely accepted. Verhagen argued that connectivism is rather a "pedagogical view."

The lack of comparative literature reviews in Connectivism papers complicates evaluating how Connectivism relates to prior theories, such as socially distributed cognition (Hutchins, 1995), which explored how connectionist ideas could be applied to social systems. Classical theories of cognition such as activity theory (Vygotsky, Leont'ev, Luria, and others starting in the 1920s) proposed that people are embedded actors, with learning considered via three features – a subject (the learner), an object (the task or activity) and tool or mediating artifacts. Social cognitive theory (Bandura, 1962) claims that people learn by watching others. Social learning theory (Miller and Dollard) elaborates this notion. Situated cognition (Brown, Collins, & Duguid, 1989; Greeno & Moore, 1993) alleged that knowledge is situated in activity bound to social, cultural and physical contexts; knowledge and learning that requires thinking on the fly rather than the storage and retrieval of conceptual knowledge. Community of practice (Lave & Wenger 1991) asserted that the process of sharing information and experiences with the group enables members to learn from each other. Collective intelligence (Lévy, 1994) describes a shared or group intelligence that emerges from collaboration and competition.

Kerr claims that although technology affects learning environments, existing learning theories are sufficient. Kop and Hill conclude that while it does not seem that connectivism is a separate learning theory, it "continues to play an important role in the development and emergence of new pedagogies, where control is shifting from the tutor to an increasingly more autonomous learner."

AlDahdouh examined the relation between connectivism and Artificial Neural Network (ANN) and the results, unexpectedly, revealed that ANN researchers use constructivism principles to teach ANN with labeled training data. However, he argued that connectivism principles are used to teach ANN only when the knowledge is unknown.

Ally recognizes that the world has changed and become more networked, so learning theories developed prior to these global changes are less relevant. However, he argues that, "What is needed is not a new stand-alone theory for the digital age, but a model that integrates the different theories to guide the design of online learning materials.".

Chatti notes that Connectivism misses some concepts, which are crucial for learning, such as reflection, learning from failures, error detection and correction, and inquiry. He introduces the Learning as a Network (LaaN) theory which builds upon connectivism, complexity theory, and double-loop learning. LaaN starts from the learner and views learning as the continuous creation of a personal knowledge network (PKN).

Schwebel of Torrens University notes that Connectivism provides a limited account of how learning occurs online. Conceding that learning occurs across networks, he introduces a paradox of change. If Connectivism accounts for these changes in networks, and these networks change so drastically, as technology has in the past, then theses like this must account for that change too, making it no longer the same theory. Furthermore, citing Understanding Media: The Extensions of Man, Schwebel notes that the nodes can impede on the types of learning that can occur, leading to issues with democratised education, as content presented within the network will both be limited to how the network can handle information, and what content is likely to be presented within the network through behaviourist style principles of reinforcement, as providers are likely to recirculate, reproduce and reiterate information that is rewarded through things such as likes.

== See also ==
- Constructivism (learning theory)
- Enactivism (psychology)
- Massive open online course
- Socially distributed cognition (Hutchins, 1995)
- Social cognitive theory (Bandura, 1962) and the derived social learning theory (Miller and Dollard)
- Activity theory (Vygotsky, Leont’ev, Luria, and others starting in the 1920s)
- Situated cognition (Greeno & Moore, 1993)
- Community of practice (Lave & Wenger 1991)
- George Siemens
- Stephen Downes
