= Ana Paula =

Ana Paula may refer to:

- Ana Paula (footballer), Brazilian women's association football forward
- Ana Paula Alves (born 1970), Brazilian sitting volleyball player
- Ana Paula Araújo (model) (born 1981), Brazilian model
- Ana Paula Araújo (newscaster) (born 1972), Brazilian newscaster and journalist
- Ana Paula Arendt (born 1980), pseudonym of R. P. Alencar, Brazilian writer and diplomat
- Ana Paula Arósio (born 1975), Brazilian model and actress
- Ana Paula Belo (born 1987), Brazilian handball player
- Ana Paula Campos (born 1994), Brazilian badminton player
- Ana Paula Connelly (born 1972), Brazilian volleyball player
- Ana Paula De Alencar (born 1992), Brazilian group rhythmic gymnast
- Ana Paula de la Peña (born 1988), Mexican tennis player
- Ana Paula de Tassis (born 1965), Italian volleyball player
- Ana Paula dos Santos (born 1963), former First Lady of Angola
- Ana Paula Höfling, American dance researcher
- Ana Paula Lopes (born 1959), Toronto-based entrepreneur
- Ana Paula Oliveira (born 1978), Brazilian football assistant referee, model and TV presenter
- Ana Paula Padrão (born 1965), Brazilian journalist and television host
- Ana Paula Pereira da Silva Villela (born 1997), Brazilian footballer
- Ana Paula Ribeiro (born 1989), Brazilian group rhythmic gymnast
- Ana Paula Ribeiro Tavares (born 1952), Angolan poet
- Ana Paula Valadão (born 1976), Brazilian Christian worship leader and singer-songwriter
- Ana Paula Vitorino (born 1962), Portuguese politician
- Ana Paula Zacarias (born 1959), Portuguese diplomat
