= Collective intelligence =

Group intelligence that emerges from collective efforts

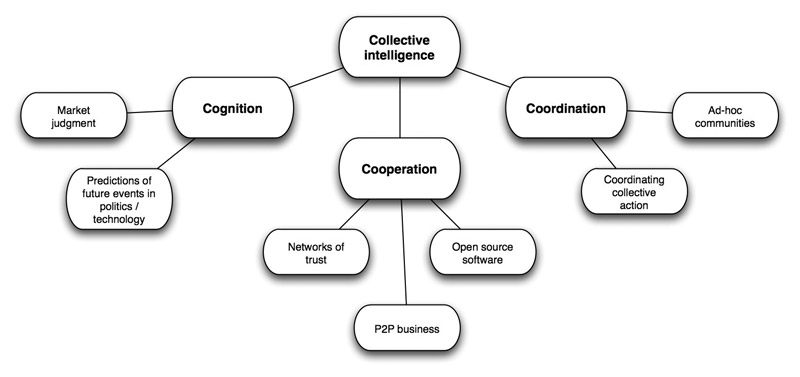
Types of collective intelligence

Collective intelligence (CI) or group intelligence (GI) is the emergent ability of groups, whether composed of humans alone, animals, or networks of humans and artificial agents, to solve problems, make decisions, or generate knowledge more effectively than individuals alone, through either cooperation or by aggregation of diverse information, perspectives, and behaviors. The term swarm intelligence (SI) is sometimes used interchangeably with collective intelligence but is simply one instance of it.

Collective intelligence encompasses not only complex adaptive systems, which self-organize and adapt in dynamic environments, but also creative and cognitive processes observed in social groups, which are often referred to as the wisdom of crowds. In this context, collective judgments, sometimes from non-experts, often exceed the accuracy of expert predictions, as illustrated by Francis Galton's famous experiment on estimating the weight of an ox. Contemporary theorists have posited that intelligence can be interpreted as an emergent collective process that manifests across various biological and social scales, including neural, organismal, and group levels.

The term appears in sociobiology, political science and in the context of mass peer review and crowdsourcing applications. It may involve consensus decision-making, social capital and formalisms such as voting systems, social media and other means of quantifying mass activity. Collective intelligence should not be conflated with metaphysical theories of panpsychism or with claims about group consciousness. These concern the fundamental nature of the mind, and the possibility that consciousness is a ubiquitous or emergent property. The empirical study of collective intelligence, however, focuses on observable mechanisms by which groups coordinate information, tasks or problem-solving.

The term group intelligence is sometimes used interchangeably with the term collective intelligence. Anita Woolley presents collective intelligence as a measure of group intelligence and group creativity. The idea is that a measure of collective intelligence covers a broad range of features of the group, mainly group composition and group interaction. The features of composition that lead to increased levels of collective intelligence in groups include criteria such as higher numbers of women in the group as well as increased diversity of the group.

Collective intelligence is attributed to bacteria and animals, but also algorithmic governance. It can be understood as an emergent property from the synergies among:

1. data-information-knowledge
2. software-hardware
3. individuals (those with new insights as well as recognized authorities) that continually learn from feedback to produce just-in-time knowledge for better decisions than these three elements acting alone

Or it can be more narrowly understood as an emergent property between people and ways of processing information. This notion of collective intelligence is referred to as "symbiotic intelligence" by Norman Lee Johnson. The concept is used in sociology, business, computer science and mass communications: it also appears in science fiction.

Pierre Lévy defines collective intelligence as "a form of universally distributed intelligence, constantly enhanced, coordinated in real time, and resulting in the effective mobilization of skills. (...) The basis and goal of collective intelligence is mutual recognition and enrichment of individuals rather than the cult of fetishized or hypostatized communities."

According to Lévy and Derrick de Kerckhove, it refers to capacity of networked ICTs (Information communication technologies) to enhance the collective pool of social knowledge by simultaneously expanding the extent of human interactions.

A broader definition was provided by Geoff Mulgan in a series of lectures and reports from 2006 onwards and in the book Big Mind, which proposed a framework for analysing any thinking system, including both human and machine intelligence, in terms of functional elements (observation, prediction, creativity, judgement etc.), learning loops and forms of organisation. The aim was to provide a way to diagnose, and improve, the collective intelligence of a city, business, NGO or parliament.

Collective intelligence strongly contributes to the shift of knowledge and power from the individual to the collective. According to Eric S. Raymond in 1998 and JC Herz in 2005, open-source intelligence will eventually generate superior outcomes to knowledge generated by proprietary software developed within corporations. Media theorist Henry Jenkins sees collective intelligence as an 'alternative source of media power', related to convergence culture. He draws attention to education and the way people are learning to participate in knowledge cultures outside formal learning settings. Henry Jenkins criticizes schools which promote 'autonomous problem solvers and self-contained learners' while remaining hostile to learning through the means of collective intelligence. Both Pierre Lévy and Henry Jenkins support the claim that collective intelligence is important for democratization, as it is interlinked with knowledge-based culture and sustained by collective idea sharing, and thus contributes to a better understanding of diverse society.

Similar to the g factor (g) for general individual intelligence, a new scientific understanding of collective intelligence aims to extract a general collective intelligence factor c factor for groups indicating a group's ability to perform a wide range of tasks, although the score is not a quotient per se.

Collective intelligence is often facilitated by digital communication platforms and collaborative technologies.

== History ==
Many theorists have interpreted Aristotle's statement in the Politics that "a feast to which many contribute is better than a dinner provided out of a single purse" to mean that just as many may bring different dishes to the table, so in a deliberation many may contribute different pieces of information to generate a better decision. Recent scholarship, however, suggests that this was probably not what Aristotle meant but is a modern interpretation based on what we now know about team intelligence. Melissa Schwartzberg (2016) reinterprets Aristotle's discussion, arguing that Politics III.11 should be read not as a claim that collective judgement is superior in quality, but as a defence of democratic rule grounded in an equal capacity for political judgment among citizens. Her "equal judgment" reading shifts emphasis from epistemic arguments about the wisdom of crowds toward Aristotle's concern with the political value of equal participation, and cautions against using Aristotle as straightforward support for contemporary claims of superior collective accuracy.

Modern collective intelligence theory (although not so named at the time) began in 1785 with the Marquis de Condorcet, whose "jury theorem" states that if each member of a voting group is more likely than not to make a correct decision, the probability that the highest vote of the group is the correct decision increases with the number of members of the group.

The concept is also found in entomologist William Morton Wheeler's observation in 1910 that seemingly independent individuals can cooperate so closely as to become indistinguishable from a single organism. Wheeler saw this collaborative process at work in ants that acted like the cells of a single beast he called a superorganism.

In 1912 Émile Durkheim identified society as the sole source of human logical thought. He argued in "The Elementary Forms of Religious Life" that society constitutes a higher intelligence because it transcends the individual over space and time. Other antecedents are Vladimir Vernadsky and Pierre Teilhard de Chardin's concept of "noosphere" and H. G. Wells's concept of "world brain".

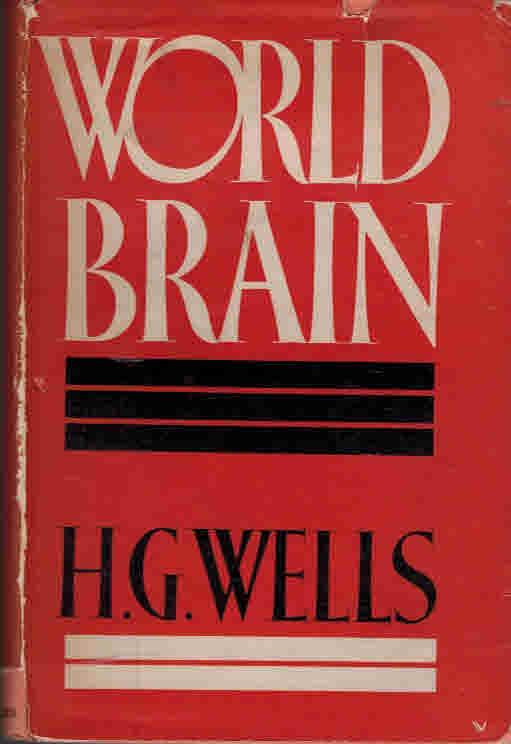
H.G. Wells World Brain (1936–1938)

Peter Russell, Elisabet Sahtouris, and Barbara Marx Hubbard (originator of the term "conscious evolution") are inspired by the visions of a noosphere – a transcendent, rapidly evolving collective intelligence – an informational cortex of the planet.

In a 1962 research report, Douglas Engelbart linked collective intelligence to organizational effectiveness, and predicted that pro-actively 'augmenting human intellect' would yield a multiplier effect in group problem solving: "Three people working together in this augmented mode [would] seem to be more than three times as effective in solving a complex problem as is one augmented person working alone". In 1994, he coined the term 'collective IQ' as a measure of collective intelligence, to focus attention on the opportunity to significantly raise collective IQ in business and society.

In 1996, in his now classic book on emotional intelligence, Daniel Goleman stated that ‘social harmony’ was the single most important factor in what he termed ‘group intelligence,’ rather than the average IQ of the group’s individuals: “it is this ability to harmonize that, all other things being equal, will make one group especially talented, productive, and successful, and another - with members whose talent and skills are equal in other regards - do poorly.”

Brown and Lauder (2000, 2001) framed collective intelligence as a form of social capital: a social capacity rooted in institutions, cooperation, and shared problem-solving, rather than as an attribute of individuals alone. They presented it as a counterweight to ‘market individualism.’ Drawing on earlier critiques of IQ-based conceptions of intelligence, Brown and Lauder emphasised that intelligence is an achievement shaped by social conditions, and that structural inequalities can restrict groups’ ability to develop and mobilise collective intelligence, even when cognitive potential is widely distributed. They recommended deliberately embedding it: “The struggle for collective intelligence involves more than changing the way we think about our own capacities and our relationship to society, it also includes weaving the potential of collective intelligence into the very fabric of our society.”

Work in the early 2000s examined the informational conditions required for collective intelligence to emerge in digitally networked groups. This line of thinking parallels other theoretical accounts that emphasise common awareness, transparent feedback and shared cognitive artefacts as enabling mechanisms for collective intelligence.

Pierre Lévy was an influential early theorist who reframed collective intelligence as a civilisation-level phenomenon enabled by networked media and shared symbolic tools. In his work he argued that the emerging information environment makes possible new forms of distributed cognition and collective sense-making, and he proposed a methodological program of "positive interpretation" to study how collectively produced meanings and problem-solving capacities can be cultivated and governed in cyberspace. Lévy's account emphasises cultural and semantic infrastructure, i.e. common languages, ontologies and mediation tools, that allow dispersed individuals to coordinate, accumulate knowledge and engage in large-scale cooperative intelligence. His ideas, first widely circulated in his 1990s writings and reiterated in later essays and reviews, have been influential in shaping debates about the digital foundations of collective intelligence and about how institutions and technologies can be designed to support collective reflection and decision-making.

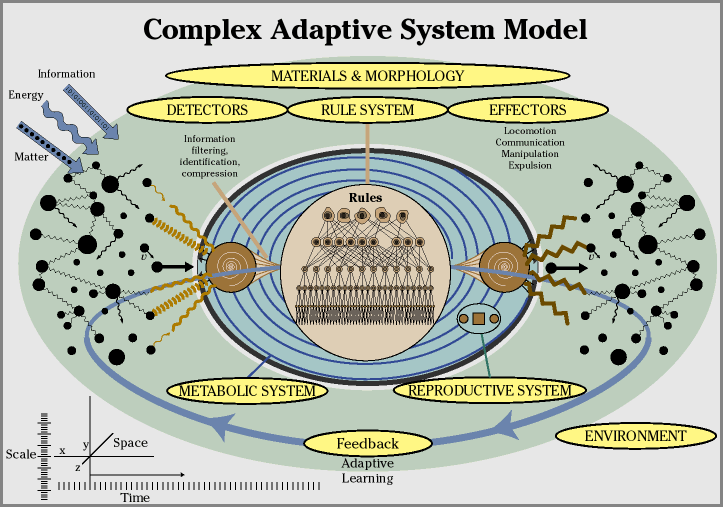
Complex adaptive systems model

Howard Bloom (1995) discussed mass behavior – collective behavior – from the level of quarks to the level of bacterial, plant, animal, and human societies. He stressed the biological adaptations that have turned most of this earth's living beings into components of what he calls "a learning machine". Bloom combined the concepts of apoptosis, parallel distributed processing, group selection, and the superorganism to produce a theory of how collective intelligence works. Later (2000), he showed how the collective intelligences of competing bacterial colonies and human societies can be explained in terms of computer-generated "complex adaptive systems" and the "genetic algorithms", concepts pioneered by John Holland.

Bloom traced the evolution of collective intelligence to our bacterial ancestors 1 billion years ago and demonstrated how a multi-species intelligence has worked since the beginning of life. Ant societies exhibit more intelligence, in terms of technology, than any other animal except for humans and co-operate in keeping livestock, for example aphids for "milking". Leaf cutters care for fungi and carry leaves to feed the fungi.

Tom Atlee focused primarily on humans and on work to upgrade what Howard Bloom calls "the group IQ". Atlee felt that collective intelligence can be encouraged "to overcome 'groupthink' and individual cognitive bias in order to allow a collective to cooperate on one process – while achieving enhanced intellectual performance." George Pór defined the collective intelligence phenomenon as "the capacity of human communities to evolve towards higher order complexity and harmony, through such innovation mechanisms as differentiation and integration, competition and collaboration." Atlee and Pór stated that "collective intelligence also involves achieving a single focus of attention and standard of metrics which provide an appropriate threshold of action". Their approach is rooted in scientific community metaphor.

Atlee and Pór suggested that the field of collective intelligence should primarily be seen as a human enterprise in which mind-sets, a willingness to share and an openness to the value of distributed intelligence for the common good are paramount, though group theory and artificial intelligence have something to offer. Individuals who respect collective intelligence are confident of their own abilities and recognize that the whole is indeed greater than the sum of any individual parts. Maximizing collective intelligence relies on the ability of an organization to accept and develop "The Golden Suggestion", which is any potentially useful input from any member. Groupthink often hampers collective intelligence by limiting input to a select few individuals or filtering potential Golden Suggestions without fully developing them to implementation.

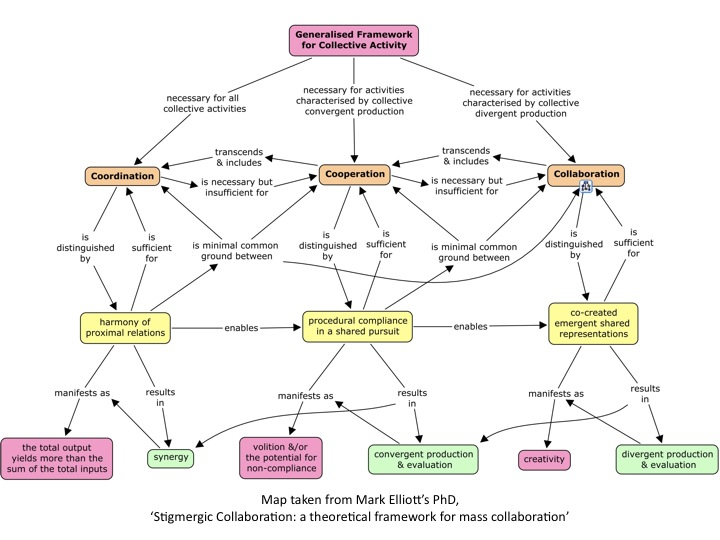
Stigmergic collaboration: a theoretical framework for mass collaboration

In 2008, Don Tapscott and Anthony D. Williams, proposed that collective intelligence is mass collaboration, and four conditions are needed to enable it:

- Openness – Sharing ideas and intellectual property: though these resources provide the edge over competitors more benefits accrue from allowing others to share ideas and gain significant improvement and scrutiny through collaboration.
- Peering – Horizontal organization as with the 'opening up' of the Linux program where users are free to modify and develop it provided that they make it available for others.
- Sharing – Companies have started to share some ideas while maintaining some degree of control over others, like potential and critical patent rights. Limiting all intellectual property shuts out opportunities, while sharing some expands markets and brings out products faster.
- Acting globally – The advancement in communication technology has prompted the rise of global companies at low overhead costs. The internet is widespread, therefore a globally integrated company has no geographical boundaries and may access new markets, ideas and technology.

The idea of collective intelligence also forms the framework for contemporary democratic theories often referred to as epistemic democracy. Epistemic democratic theories refer to the capacity of the populace, either through deliberation or aggregation of knowledge, to track the truth and relies on mechanisms to synthesize and apply collective intelligence. Political theorist Hélène Landemore has written about this in works such as ‘Democratic Reason: Politics, Collective Intelligence, and the Rule of the Many.

Collective intelligence was introduced into the machine learning community in the late 20th century, and matured into a broader consideration of how to design "collectives" of self-interested adaptive agents to meet a system-wide goal. This was related to single-agent work on "reward shaping" and has been taken forward by numerous researchers in the game theory and engineering communities.

=== The Wisdom of Crowds ===
A major contribution to the theory of collective intelligence was made by James Surowiecki in his book The Wisdom of Crowds (2005), which explores how the aggregation of information from groups of individuals can lead to better decisions than those made by any single member or expert. Surowiecki identifies three key conditions for a group to display "crowd wisdom": diversity, independence of thought, and decentralization. Under these conditions, collective judgments can be more accurate, innovative, and resilient than those of experts.

=== Empirical studies of Wisdom of Crowds ===
Several empirical studies on the wisdom of the crowd support the notion that groups outperform individuals in estimation, decision-making, and coordination tasks when members contribute independent and diverse perspectives. Recent research reinforces and expands upon Surowiecki's findings: Simoiu et al. (2020) conducted large-scale experiments validating that crowd aggregated answers across many domains outperform individual judgments, highlighting crowd consistency and domain-dependent variation.

=== Democratic decision-making and Wisdom of Crowds ===
Carpentras et al. (2025) propose applying a 'Wisdom of Crowds' type of collective intelligence to large-scale democratic decision-making. They propose coupling peer-production "remixing" (allowing participants to iteratively modify and extend others' proposals) with a distributed voting selection stage to identify high-quality solutions without requiring every participant to review every proposal. The authors emphasise that the results are theoretical and simulation-based and note limitations including stylised assumptions about time budgets and utility generation, simplified reviewer behaviour, and the absence of field trials or explicit modelling of strategic/adversarial effects, and therefore call for empirical testing.

=== Aggregation and Wisdom of Crowds ===
In the study of collective intelligence, aggregation refers to the process of combining multiple individual judgments, signals, or behaviors into a single group-level output, such as a decision, forecast, or solution. Aggregation mechanisms are central to “the wisdom of crowds” phenomena, where the average or otherwise combined estimate of many individuals can be more accurate than that of most individuals or even experts, provided the group has diversity, independence of opinions, and a way to aggregate them (for example, by averaging numerical estimates or voting over alternatives).P can aggregate dispersed information into prices that approximate consensus probabilistic forecasts of future events, often outperforming many individual forecasters. Models of problem‑solving groups further indicate that aggregation benefits from cognitive and heuristic diversity among members, as diverse groups can collectively explore solution spaces more effectively than homogeneous groups or even high‑ability individuals alone.

=== Aggregation beyond Wisdom of Crowds model ===
Kameda, Toyokawa and Tindale (2022) review information aggregation mechanisms that extend the classical wisdom of crowds model. The authors distinguish between consensus decision making, where groups aim to reach a common outcome, and combined decision making, where individuals make influenced but independent choices. They identify a range of procedures that can improve collective accuracy beyond simple averaging, including expertise and accuracy weighting, confidence-weighted aggregation, opt-in participation, social-learning rules such as copy-when-uncertain, and cognitive division of labour. The review draws extensively on forecasting tournament evidence, in which large numbers of participants make probabilistic predictions that are scored for accuracy. Results from these tournaments show that diverse teams, calibration training and weighted or extremised aggregation algorithms can achieve higher accuracy than unweighted means. The authors argue that these mechanisms illustrate how collective intelligence can emerge when individual heterogeneity is retained and aggregation rules are designed to reduce correlated errors and information cascades.

=== Limitations of the wisdom of crowds ===
A notable cautionary study by Lorenz et al. (2011) showed that even mild social influence among group members can undermine the wisdom of crowds effect by reducing diversity of opinions and causing convergence on inaccurate estimates. They identified three main phenomena: the social influence effect reduces diversity without improving accuracy; the range reduction effect shifts the true value toward the periphery of estimate ranges, making the crowd less reliable; and the confidence effect increases individuals' confidence with no corresponding improvement in group accuracy.

In Orzechowski et al. The authors reproduce this effect using ensembles of decision trees and support vector machines and conclude that dependence and low diversity of inputs can negate the usual benefits of larger groups. This result emphasises the importance of preserving independence and diversity when aggregating many judgments.

== Collective intelligence factor c ==
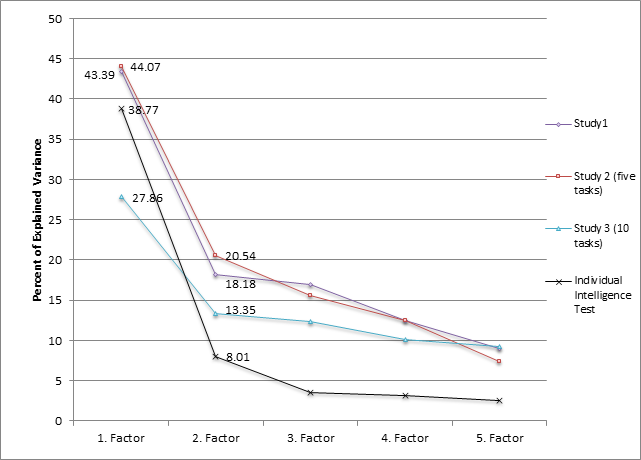
Scree plot showing percent of explained variance for the first factors in Woolley et al.'s two original studies in 2010

Initially, researchers attempting to create a metric for collective intelligence called it ‘collective IQ.’ They defined it as ‘a measure of how well people can work together on important challenges – how quickly and intelligently they can anticipate or respond to a situation, leveraging their collective perception, memory, insight, vision, planning, reasoning, foresight, and experience into applicable knowledge.’ Now, new scientific understanding of collective intelligence defines it as a group's general ability to perform a wide range of tasks.

The definition, operationalization and statistical methods are similar to the psychometric approach of general individual intelligence. Hereby, an individual's performance on a given set of cognitive tasks is used to measure general cognitive ability indicated by the general intelligence factor g proposed by English psychologist Charles Spearman and extracted via factor analysis. In the same vein as g serves to display between-individual performance differences on cognitive tasks, collective intelligence research aims to find a parallel intelligence factor for groups 'c factor' (also called 'collective intelligence factor' (CI)) displaying between-group differences on task performance. Yet tasks, hereby, refer to mental or intellectual tasks performed by small groups even though the concept is hoped to be transferable to other performances and any groups or crowds reaching from families to companies and even whole cities. Since individuals' g factor scores are highly correlated with full-scale IQ scores, which are in turn regarded as good estimates of g, this measurement of collective intelligence can also be seen as an intelligence indicator or quotient respectively for a group (Group-IQ) parallel to an individual's intelligence quotient (IQ) even though the score is not a quotient per se.

Mathematically, c and g are both variables summarizing positive correlations among different tasks supposing that performance on one task is comparable with performance on other similar tasks. c thus is a source of variance among groups and can only be considered as a group's standing on the c factor compared to other groups in a given relevant population. The concept is in contrast to competing hypotheses including other correlational structures to explain group intelligence, such as a composition out of several equally important but independent factors as found in individual personality research.

Besides, this scientific idea also aims to explore the causes affecting collective intelligence, such as group size, collaboration tools or group members' interpersonal skills. The MIT Center for Collective Intelligence, for instance, announced the detection of The Genome of Collective Intelligence as one of its main goals aiming to develop a "taxonomy of organizational building blocks, or genes, that can be combined and recombined to harness the intelligence of crowds".

=== Causes ===
Individual intelligence is shown to be genetically and environmentally influenced. Analogously, collective intelligence research aims to explore reasons why certain groups perform more intelligently than other groups given that c is just moderately correlated with the intelligence of individual group members. According to Woolley et al.'s results, neither team cohesion nor motivation or satisfaction is correlated with c. However, they claim that three factors were found as significant correlates: the variance in the number of speaking turns, group members' average social sensitivity and the proportion of females. All three had similar predictive power for c, but only social sensitivity was statistically significant (b=0.33, P=0.05).

The number of speaking turns indicates that "groups where a few people dominated the conversation were less collectively intelligent than those with a more equal distribution of conversational turn-taking". Providing multiple team members with the chance to speak up therefore makes a group more intelligent.

Group members' social sensitivity was measured via the Reading the Mind in the Eyes Test (RME) and correlated .26 with c. This test asks participants to detect thinking or feeling expressed in other peoples' eyes presented on pictures and is assessed in multiple choice format. The test aims to measure peoples' theory of mind (ToM), also called 'mentalizing' or 'mind reading', which refers to the ability to attribute mental states, such as beliefs, desires or intents, to other people and in how far people understand that others have beliefs, desires, intentions or perspectives different from their own ones. RME is a ToM test for adults that shows sufficient test-retest reliability and constantly differentiates control groups from individuals with functional autism or Asperger Syndrome. It is one of the most widely accepted and well-validated tests for ToM within adults. ToM can be regarded as an associated subset of skills and abilities within the broader concept of emotional intelligence.

The proportion of females as a predictor of c was largely mediated by social sensitivity (Sobel z = 1.93, P= 0.03) which is in line with previous research showing that women score higher on social sensitivity tests. While a mediation, statistically speaking, clarifies the mechanism underlying the relationship between a dependent and an independent variable, Woolley agreed in an interview with the Harvard Business Review that these findings are saying that groups of women are smarter than groups of men. However, she relativizes this stating that the actual important thing is the high social sensitivity of group members.

Current theory holds that the collective intelligence factor c is an emergent property resulting from bottom-up as well as top-down processes. The bottom-up processes cover aggregated group-member characteristics. The top-down processes cover group structures and norms that influence a group's way of collaborating and coordinating.

=== Processes ===
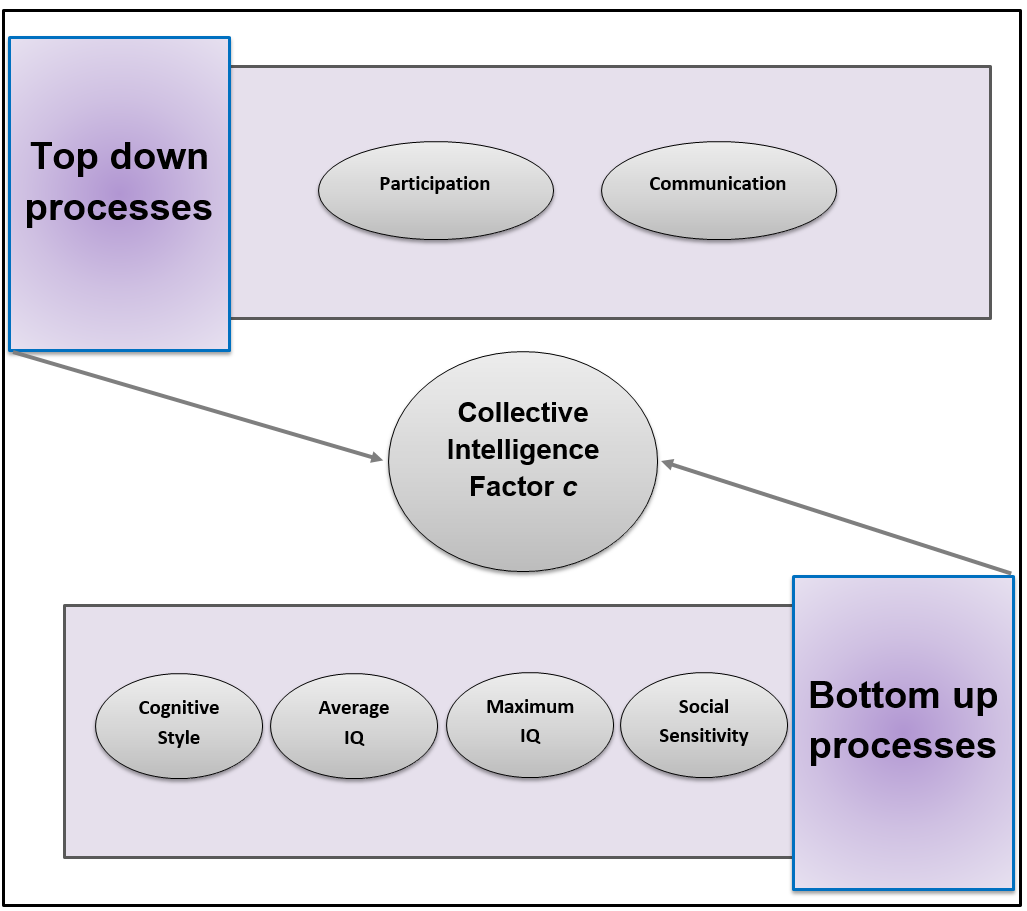
Predictors for the collective intelligence factor c. Suggested by Woolley, Aggarwal & Malone (2015)

==== Top-down processes ====
Top-down processes cover group interaction, such as structures, processes, and norms. An example of such top-down processes is conversational turn-taking. Research further suggest that collectively intelligent groups communicate more in general as well as more equally; same applies for participation and is shown for face-to-face as well as online groups communicating only via writing.

==== Bottom-up processes ====
Bottom-up processes include group composition, namely the characteristics of group members which are aggregated to the team level. An example of such bottom-up processes is the average social sensitivity or the average and maximum intelligence scores of group members. Furthermore, collective intelligence was found to be related to a group's cognitive diversity including thinking styles and perspectives. Groups that are moderately diverse in cognitive style have higher collective intelligence than those who are very similar in cognitive style or very different. Consequently, groups where members are too similar to each other lack the variety of perspectives and skills needed to perform well.

==== Serial vs Parallel processes ====
For most of human history, collective intelligence was confined to small tribal groups in which opinions were aggregated through real-time parallel interactions among members. In modern times, mass communication, mass media, and networking technologies have enabled collective intelligence to span massive groups, distributed across continents and time-zones. To accommodate this shift in scale, collective intelligence in large-scale groups been dominated by serialized polling processes such as aggregating up-votes, likes, and ratings over time. In one significant study of serialized collective intelligence, it was found that the first vote contributed to a serialized voting system can distort the final result by 34%.

To address the problems of serialized aggregation of input among large-scale groups, recent advancements collective intelligence have worked to replace serialized votes, polls, and markets, with parallel systems such as "human swarms" modeled after synchronous swarms in nature. Based on natural process of Swarm Intelligence, these artificial swarms of networked humans enable participants to work together in parallel to answer questions and make predictions as an emergent collective intelligence. In one high-profile example, a human swarm challenge by CBS Interactive to predict the Kentucky Derby. The swarm correctly predicted the first four horses, in order, defying 542–1 odds and turning a $20 bet into $10,800.

The value of parallel collective intelligence was demonstrated in medical applications by researchers at Stanford University School of Medicine and Unanimous AI in a set of published studies wherein groups of human doctors were connected by real-time swarming algorithms and tasked with diagnosing chest x-rays for the presence of pneumonia. When working together as "human swarms", the groups of experienced radiologists demonstrated a 33% reduction in diagnostic errors as compared to traditional methods.

=== Evidence ===
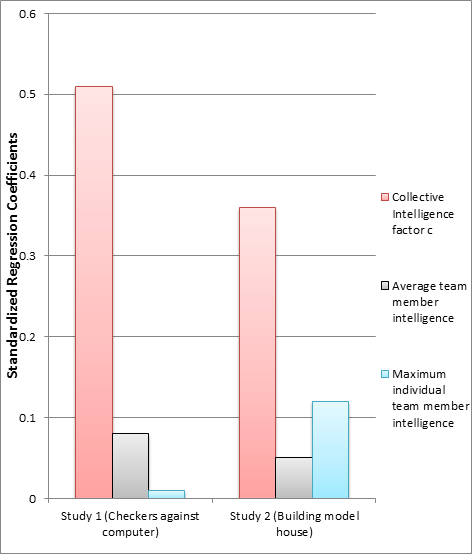
Standardized Regression Coefficients for the collective intelligence factor c as found in Woolley et al.'s (2010) two original studies. c and average (maximum) member intelligence scores are regressed on the criterion tasks.

Woolley, Chabris, Pentland, Hashmi, & Malone (2010), the originators of this scientific understanding of collective intelligence, found a single statistical factor for collective intelligence in their research across 192 groups with people randomly recruited from the public. In Woolley et al.'s two initial studies, groups worked together on different tasks from the McGrath Task Circumplex, a well-established taxonomy of group tasks. Tasks were chosen from all four quadrants of the circumplex and included visual puzzles, brainstorming, making collective moral judgments, and negotiating over limited resources. The results in these tasks were taken to conduct a factor analysis. Both studies showed support for a general collective intelligence factor c underlying differences in group performance with an initial eigenvalue accounting for 43% (44% in study 2) of the variance, whereas the next factor accounted for only 18% (20%). That fits the range normally found in research regarding a general individual intelligence factor g typically accounting for 40% to 50% percent of between-individual performance differences on cognitive tests.

Afterwards, a more complex task was solved by each group to determine whether c factor scores predict performance on tasks beyond the original test. Criterion tasks were playing checkers (draughts) against a standardized computer in the first and a complex architectural design task in the second study. In a regression analysis using both individual intelligence of group members and c to predict performance on the criterion tasks, c had a significant effect, but average and maximum individual intelligence had not. While average (r=0.15, P=0.04) and maximum intelligence (r=0.19, P=0.008) of individual group members were moderately correlated with c, c was still a much better predictor of the criterion tasks. According to Woolley et al., this supports the existence of a collective intelligence factor c, because it demonstrates an effect over and beyond group members' individual intelligence and thus that c is more than just the aggregation of the individual IQs or the influence of the group member with the highest IQ.

Engel et al. (2014) replicated Woolley et al.'s findings applying an accelerated battery of tasks with a first factor in the factor analysis explaining 49% of the between-group variance in performance with the following factors explaining less than half of this amount. Moreover, they found a similar result for groups working together online communicating only via text and confirmed the role of female proportion and social sensitivity in causing collective intelligence in both cases. Similarly to Woolley et al., they also measured social sensitivity with the RME which is actually meant to measure people's ability to detect mental states in other peoples' eyes. The online collaborating participants, however, did neither know nor see each other at all. The authors conclude that scores on the RME must be related to a broader set of abilities of social reasoning than only drawing inferences from other people's eye expressions.

A collective intelligence factor c in the sense of Woolley et al. was further found in groups of MBA students working together over the course of a semester, in online gaming groups as well as in groups from different cultures and groups in different contexts in terms of short-term versus long-term groups. None of these investigations considered team members' individual intelligence scores as control variables.

=== Predictive validity ===
Next to predicting a group's performance on more complex criterion tasks as shown in the original experiments, the collective intelligence factor c was also found to predict group performance in diverse tasks in MBA classes lasting over several months. Thereby, highly collectively intelligent groups earned significantly higher scores on their group assignments although their members did not do any better on other individually performed assignments. Moreover, highly collective intelligent teams improved performance over time suggesting that more collectively intelligent teams learn better. This is another potential parallel to individual intelligence where more intelligent people are found to acquire new material quicker.

Individual intelligence can be used to predict plenty of life outcomes from school attainment and career success to health outcomes and even mortality. Whether collective intelligence is able to predict other outcomes besides group performance on mental tasks has still to be investigated.

=== Potential connections to individual intelligence ===
Gladwell (2008) showed that the relationship between individual IQ and success works only to a certain point and that additional IQ points over an estimate of IQ 120 do not translate into real life advantages. If a similar border exists for Group-IQ or if advantages are linear and infinite, has still to be explored. Similarly, demand for further research on possible connections of individual and collective intelligence exists within plenty of other potentially transferable logics of individual intelligence, such as, for instance, the development over time or the question of improving intelligence. Whereas it is controversial whether human intelligence can be enhanced via training, a group's collective intelligence potentially offers simpler opportunities for improvement by exchanging team members or implementing structures and technologies. Moreover, social sensitivity was found to be, at least temporarily, improvable by reading literary fiction as well as watching drama movies. In how far such training ultimately improves collective intelligence through social sensitivity remains an open question.

There are further more advanced concepts and factor models attempting to explain individual cognitive ability including the categorization of intelligence in fluid and crystallized intelligence or the hierarchical model of intelligence differences. Further supplementing explanations and conceptualizations for the factor structure of the Genomes of collective intelligence besides a general 'c factor', though, are missing yet.

=== Controversies and Counter-Evidence for Collective Intelligence ===
Other scholars explain team performance by aggregating team members' general intelligence to the team level instead of building an own overall collective intelligence measure. Devine and Philips (2001) showed in a meta-analysis that mean cognitive ability predicts team performance in laboratory settings (0.37) as well as field settings (0.14) – note that this is only a small effect. Suggesting a strong dependence on the relevant tasks, other scholars showed that tasks requiring a high degree of communication and cooperation are found to be most influenced by the team member with the lowest cognitive ability. Tasks in which selecting the best team member is the most successful strategy, are shown to be most influenced by the member with the highest cognitive ability.

Since Woolley et al.'s results do not show any influence of group satisfaction, group cohesiveness, or motivation, they, at least implicitly, challenge these concepts regarding the importance for group performance in general and thus contrast meta-analytically proven evidence concerning the positive effects of group cohesion, motivation and satisfaction on group performance.

Credé and Howardson (2017) claimed that the evidence for collective intelligence in the body of work by Woolley et al. was weak and may contain errors or misunderstandings of the data. For example, Woolley et al. stated in their findings that the maximum individual score on the Wonderlic Personnel Test (WPT; an individual intelligence test used in their research) was 39, but also that the maximum averaged team score on the same test was also a 39. This indicates that their sample seemingly had a team composed entirely of people who, individually, got exactly the same score on the WPT, and also all happened to all have achieved the highest scores on the WPT found in Woolley et al. Credé and Howardson claimed this was unlikely to occur. Other anomalies found in the data indicate that results may be driven in part by low-effort responding. For instance, Woolley et al.'s data indicates that at least one team scored a 0 on a task in which they were given 10 minutes to come up with as many uses for a brick as possible. Similarly, Woolley et al.'s data show that at least one team had an average score of 8 out of 50 on the WPT. Credé and Howardson claimed that the probability of this occurring with study participants who are putting forth effort is nearly zero. This may explain why Woolley et al. found that the group's individual intelligence scores were not predictive of performance. In addition, low effort on tasks in human subjects research may inflate evidence for a supposed collective intelligence factor based on similarity of performance across tasks, because a team's low effort on one research task may generalize to low effort across many tasks. It is notable that such a phenomenon is present merely because of the low stakes setting of laboratory research for research participants and not because it reflects how teams operate in organizations.

Woolley, Kim and Malone (2018) responded to the methodological critiques of the collective intelligence factor (c) raised by Credé and Howardson, reporting re-analyses and extensions of their earlier work to clarify measurement procedures and robustness. Using larger and re-examined datasets, additional task controls and alternative scoring approaches, they showed that group-level predictors originally associated with c, such as social sensitivity, conversational turn-taking and proportion of women in the group, continue to account for variance in group performance across diverse tasks after addressing the specific concerns raised by critics. The authors emphasised that c is not a simple analogue of individual intelligence but a multi-faceted, task-dependent construct that requires careful operationalisation. They recommend standardized batteries, transparency in task scoring, and further replication with varied group compositions and real-world tasks.

In May 2022 the authors of "Quantifying collective intelligence in human groups" (Riedl et al., 2021) published a formal correction noting that an error in a software package had led to incorrectly reported average variance extracted (AVE) values in their confirmatory factor analyses; the correction replaces an earlier AVE of 44% with a corrected AVE of 19.6% for the reported one-factor models.

The average variance extracted (AVE) is a standard measure used in confirmatory factor analysis that quantifies how much of the variance in the observed indicators is explained by the latent factor. A commonly cited rule of thumb (Fornell and Larcker, 1981) considers AVE ≥ 0.50 indicative of acceptable convergent validity. Values substantially below this threshold suggest that the factor explains little of the indicator variance, and therefore raise concerns about convergent validity.

The corrected AVE therefore raises legitimate questions about the convergent validity of the specific confirmatory factor models reported. At the same time, Riedl et al. note in their correction that these changes do not alter the paper's major conclusions, and the article presents multiple lines of evidence for a general collective intelligence factor (including reported factor loadings, other model fit indices for alternative models, and a meta-analytic dataset drawn from 22 studies). The issue is part of an ongoing methodological debate about whether group performance is best characterised by a single general CI factor or by multiple, task-dependent dimensions.

== Collective intelligence and complex adaptive systems ==
Research increasingly conceptualizes collective intelligence systems as a subset of complex adaptive systems (CAS). These systems display three core properties: adaptation to uncertain and changing environments, autonomous self-organization, and emergence of global behaviors from local interactions.

Collective intelligence draws on enabling mechanisms such as feedback dynamics, distributed control, redundancy, robustness, and nonlinear interaction patterns: features also central to CAS. In human-machine systems, like social media platforms and collaborative AI environments, collective intelligence emerges from large-scale, many-to-many interactions across social and technological agents. These systems continuously adjust their structure and strategies via adaptive feedback processes, sometimes resulting in "emergent" collective behaviors that cannot be understood by analyzing participants in isolation.

Within scientific and engineering practice, the study of collective intelligence includes both analysis—understanding natural phenomena in biological or social collective systems, and design, creating artificial, computational, or hybrid systems for distributed problem-solving. As research advances, collective intelligence and complex adaptive systems increasingly converge, offering methodologies for modeling, simulating, and engineering resilience, scalability, and emergent intelligence in large-scale socio-technical environments.

Ha and Tang (2022) review how ideas from collective intelligence and complex systems are used in machine learning. They note that ensemble methods, population-based training, evolutionary search, multi-agent reinforcement learning, swarm-inspired optimisation, federated learning and mixture-of-experts models rely on diversity, parallel search and aggregation. The authors present these techniques as examples of collective problem solving in artificial systems and outline areas where complex systems theory may inform future work.

A recent theoretical perspective treats intelligence at all scales as a form of collective behaviour in complex adaptive systems. Falandays et al. (2023) argue that many processes described as individual intelligence can be understood as emergent interactions among components, whether these occur within neural systems, multicellular organisms, animal groups or human social and cultural networks. The authors present examples from biological, cognitive and social systems to support the view that the distinction between individual and collective intelligence often reflects the level of analysis rather than a fundamental difference in kind.

== Collective intelligence, futures studies and strategic foresight ==
Futures studies and strategic foresight use collective intelligence methods to explore and shape possible futures, often through participatory processes that aggregate insights from diverse stakeholders into shared scenarios, visions, and early‑warning analyses. Some authors describe this as "collective forward intelligence," emphasizing dynamic, networked sense‑making about long‑term change in areas such as public policy, urban development, and sustainability transitions. Practical applications include crowd forecasting for predicting pandemics, economic trends, and election outcomes, as demonstrated by Sweden's FOI in supporting Ukrainian anticipatory governance, and European initiatives like Futures4Europe that explore future-oriented collective intelligence for research and innovation policy. In global futures research, systems such as the Millennium Project's Global Futures Intelligence System integrate data, expert judgment, and public input to support science–technology foresight and policy-making.

== Collective intelligence and deliberative democracy ==
Deliberative democracy is a form of participatory democracy which emphasizes informed and inclusive dialogue among citizens to reach collective decisions on public issues through reasoned debate and consensus-building. It harnesses collective intelligence by aggregating diverse perspectives and knowledge to improve the legitimacy and quality of decisions.

A key institutional mechanism of deliberative democracy is the citizens' assembly, also called a mini-public. Deliberation in citizens' assemblies is characterized by extensive information exchange, facilitated discussions, and engagement with expert testimony. This process enables participants to reflect on values and societal trade-offs thoughtfully before formulating recommendations.

The participants of a citizens' assembly are randomly selected via sortition to provide a representative cross-section of the population. This selection process typically involves an initial broad random sampling followed by stratification to ensure demographic diversity across categories such as gender, age, socioeconomic status, ethnicity, and possibly opinion on the topic to be discussed. By capturing a microcosm of society in this manner, citizens' assemblies enhance collective intelligence by enabling a diversity of experiences and viewpoints greater than that typically found in elected legislatures.

Citizens' assemblies are particularly valuable in tackling highly controversial and sensitive issues often avoided or intractable in traditional political settings. For example, the Citizens' Assembly (Ireland) played a pivotal role in informing the public debate and legislative reform on abortion in Ireland (formally referred to as the debate on the Eighth Amendment of the Constitution), demonstrating how such assemblies can generate legitimate, informed, and well-considered policy recommendations on divisive topics.

Research shows that citizens' assemblies significantly contribute to democratic renewal by enhancing political efficacy among participants and the broader public, fostering social trust, countering political polarization, and reinforcing societal cohesion through collective deliberation. They facilitate inclusive governance by involving people who are otherwise politically disengaged, resulting in more representative decision-making and increased democratic legitimacy. Assemblies produce well-considered public judgments that help policymakers make difficult decisions, thereby elevating the quality of governance, which is why governments around the world are increasingly using them to cocreate policy.

Rafał Olszowski's Collective Intelligence in Open Policymaking (2024) provides a comprehensive framework for understanding the evolution of collective intelligence beyond the individual level, focusing on open policymaking initiatives. The book combines theoretical insights with practical case studies, such as Decide Madrid and Better Reykjavik, exploring how collective intelligence shapes democratic innovation and citizen participation in policy design.

Public Deliberation in the Digital Age: Platforms, Participation, and Legitimacy (2025) offers a comprehensive examination of how digital platforms are transforming deliberative democratic processes and citizen engagement. The book combines theoretical insights with empirical case studies to analyze how digital tools influence participation, deliberation quality, and the legitimacy of democratic decision-making. It discusses diverse applications ranging from climate governance to youth engagement and AI-mediated dialogue, exploring challenges such as the digital divide and multilingual deliberation. Using a framework of input-throughput-output legitimacy, it systematically evaluates how digital platforms shape who participates, how engagement occurs, and how these processes connect to broader public outcomes.

Lewis et al. (2025) discuss design principles for digitally enabled civic infrastructure intended to support large scale deliberation and ongoing feedback between citizens and public institutions. The paper describes a modular architecture that combines frequent digital engagement, algorithmic synthesis of contributions, and targeted small-group deliberation so that local deliberative outputs can be aggregated and fed back into policy processes. It recommends tools for clustering and bridging opinion data, Bayesian adaptive evaluation, and iterative sandboxing to test platform designs. The authors (including Geoff Mulgan, Professor of Collective Intelligence, Public Policy and Social Innovation at UCL) emphasise governance requirements such as transparency of aggregation methods, community control of data, and safeguards against manipulation and exclusion.

Although the paper does not explicitly use the term "collective intelligence", its proposals map directly onto established collective-intelligence concepts and mechanisms. From a collective-intelligence perspective, the described architecture explicitly addresses three well-studied requirements for producing reliable group judgements: broad and diverse participation to increase the information base; mechanisms for preserving or restoring independence of contributions to avoid correlated errors; and principled aggregation procedures that transform many low-cost inputs into higher-quality collective outputs. Small, well resourced deliberative modules such as citizens' assemblies operate as high-quality signal generators; algorithmic synthesis and targeted sampling convert those local signals into system-level inputs; and adaptive evaluation provides the feedback loops necessary for learning and improvement. The paper therefore provides an applied design programme for connecting deliberative institutions with computational aggregation and governance practices that are central to contemporary collective-intelligence research.

Interactive Management, a facilitated group method originating in the work of John N. Warfield and developed in several research traditions including Structured Democratic Dialogue, has participants judge influence relations between their ideas and presents the result as a directed graph rather than a ranked list. Researchers who apply it as a collective-intelligence method have described the facilitation skills it depends on, and it has been assessed for use online, where the constraints of a single meeting room no longer apply.

== Computational collective intelligence ==
In 2001, Tadeusz (Tad) Szuba from the AGH University in Poland proposed a formal model for the phenomenon of collective intelligence. It is assumed to be an unconscious, random, parallel, and distributed computational process, run in mathematical logic by the social structure.

In this model, beings and information are modeled as abstract information molecules carrying expressions of mathematical logic. They are quasi-randomly displacing due to their interaction with their environments with their intended displacements. Their interaction in abstract computational space creates multi-thread inference process which we perceive as collective intelligence. Thus, a non-Turing model of computation is used. This theory allows simple formal definition of collective intelligence as the property of social structure and seems to be working well for a wide spectrum of beings, from bacterial colonies up to human social structures. Collective intelligence considered as a specific computational process is providing a straightforward explanation of several social phenomena. For this model of collective intelligence, the formal definition of IQS (IQ Social) was proposed and was defined as "the probability function over the time and domain of N-element inferences which are reflecting inference activity of the social structure". While IQS seems to be computationally hard, modeling of social structure in terms of a computational process as described above gives a chance for approximation. Prospective applications are optimization of companies through the maximization of their IQS, and the analysis of drug resistance against collective intelligence of bacterial colonies.

== Collective intelligence and leadership ==
Collective intelligence in organisational teams depends on leadership processes that enable the integration of distributed knowledge, coordination of specialised contributions, and adaptive decision-making. These features indicate a broad overlap with complexity leadership theory, i.e the study of leadership in complex adaptive systems. Research has identified two broad leadership forms that support collective intelligence: shared or distributed leadership within teams, and systems leadership that coordinates action across organisations and sectors.

Shared leadership is where leadership functions are exercised by multiple team members rather than a single designated leader. It is also defined as an emergent phenomenon that arises naturally among team members when the conditions are conducive to it. Such shared leadership is consistently associated with higher team performance and greater collective efficacy. Network and density measures of shared leadership often predict performance better than single-source measures. Other determining factors are task interdependence, psychological safety, and member expertise.

Systems leadership refers to leadership enacted across institutional boundaries to mobilise multiple organisations and stakeholders for problems that no single actor can solve. Leadership dispersed through networks and practised as a set of functions or processes can increase a group's capacity to integrate diverse information and adapt to complex tasks. A review of empirical case studies found that effective systems leadership begins with a clear call to action and the formation of a committed coalition. Sustaining momentum depends on system structures, supportive cultures and interpersonal factors, including maintaining a shared purpose, strong relationships, curiosity, and an understanding of system dynamics and resilience. Indicators of success include enjoyment in the work, gains in system resources and observable improvements in population-level data. Also, seeing leadership as a distributed, resourcing function rather than a single-person role. Systems leadership is especially relevant where collective intelligence must be organised at scale, for example in the emergency response to a crisis such as a pandemic.

To fully unlock collective intelligence at scale, Cairney and Toomey (2025) advocate for multi-level and systems-oriented leadership for addressing complex societal problems. This approach confirms the conclusions of earlier research that successful leadership is a distributed capability that must be cultivated across organisations and networks. They identified several key features of collectively intelligent systems leadership: "reject heroic top-down leadership and central control in favour of collaboration across boundaries; develop attributes (e.g. humility), mindsets (e.g. big picture), and skills (e.g. facilitation) to act in complex systems (albeit without a common view on what a complex system is); and, seek organisational and political support for this approach."

Pentland (2012) reports applied sociometric studies showing that team performance correlates with three measurable interaction parameters: amount of exchanges, evenness of participation, and external connections. He found that measurable patterns of interaction and communication within teams, such as balanced conversational turn-taking, broad participation, and high engagement, predict team performance more reliably than individual intelligence measures. The study frames leadership as a pattern-shaping role in which leaders and “charismatic connectors” facilitate distributed participation and information flow rather than solely exercising hierarchical authority. From a collective intelligence perspective the paper maps onto core CI mechanisms: it treats reliable performance as an emergent property of interaction patterns (not of individual ability), it identifies measurable signals that support shared situational awareness and information integration, and it demonstrates how feedback loops (measurement → visualization → training → improved interaction) can increase collective problem solving. This applied work has influenced managerial practice but should be read alongside peer-reviewed studies such as Woolley et al. (2010).

== Applications ==
As well as Wikipedia itself, there have been many recent applications of collective intelligence, including in fields such as crowdsourcing, citizen science and prediction markets. The Nesta Centre for Collective Intelligence Design was launched in 2018 and has produced many surveys of applications as well as funding experiments. In 2020 the United Nations Development Program (UNDP) Accelerator Labs began using collective intelligence methods in their work to accelerate innovation for the Sustainable Development Goals, e.g. Global Mindpool.

=== Wikimedia projects as examples of collective intelligence ===
In Wikipedia and other Wikimedia projects, large numbers of volunteers collaborate to create and curate content without centralised editorial control. In this participatory knowledge-building process, Wikipedia editors rely on consensus decision-making methods down to the edit level, minimizing deference to authority in favour of processes that consult all interested and involved parties.

These projects are therefore cited in the academic literature as prominent examples of large-scale collective intelligence. Livingstone (2016), for example, states that Wikipedia, “by relying on sociotechnical ensembles of human intelligence, programmed bots, social bureaucracy, and software protocols, a more humanistic CI, as proposed by Lévy, is realized in a virtual knowledge space that embodies information as both product and process (...).”

Early research conceptualised Wikipedia’s model of knowledge production as replacing traditional expert gatekeeping with consensus-oriented, participatory mechanisms that harness diverse contributions from lay contributors. A meta-review of academic work notes that Wikipedia exhibits key collective intelligence features such as indirect coordination (stigmergy), distributed cognition through bots and tools, and emergent structures arising from many individual edits and discussions. Recent systematic reviews of automated content generation for Wikipedia also describe the interaction between human contributors and automated agents (bots) as part of a broader collective intelligence ecosystem, with implications for collaborative content creation and quality management at Internet scale.

Wikidata, a collaboratively edited structured data knowledge graph associated with Wikimedia projects, has also been described as a large-scale collective intelligence platform. It supports multilingual knowledge representation and is maintained by a global community of volunteers, allowing widely distributed contributions to a shared data resource that underpins various Wikimedia and external applications.

=== United Nations' Global Mindpool ===
Global Mindpool is a global collective intelligence for a sustainable future. Created by the United Nations Development Program, Its goal is to empower people everywhere on the planet and harvest their insights with a platform that involves them in finding the best ways of solving the climate crisis.

=== Government and public policy ===
Lowry et al. (2023) present a peer-reviewed case study illustrating how structured collective intelligence methods can be used to redesign public sector data infrastructures. Working with researchers, data custodians and policy stakeholders, the authors applied scenario-based design, interactive management and ideawriting to surface unmet user needs and points of friction in the Northern Ireland Longitudinal Study. The process produced concrete institutional changes, including a redesigned research interface, synthetic training datasets and new user forums intended to widen access to complex administrative data and strengthen its policy value. The study is cited as evidence that collective intelligence techniques can support practical improvements in government data systems while highlighting challenges such as stakeholder representativeness and the labour required to maintain research-ready datasets.

=== Automated software construction ===
Collective intelligence has been applied to automated software engineering through frameworks that aggregate and operationalise distributed developer knowledge. Liu et al. (2025) propose CIPAC (Collective Intelligence–based Program Automated Construction), a framework that uses both historical collective intelligence from open-source repositories and real-time collective input from developer communities to automate the construction of software-level programs. The system integrates collective specification refinement, architecture generation, program synthesis and quality optimisation within a single workflow, enabling the automatic assembly of complete and test-validated software projects rather than isolated code fragments. CIPAC operationalises collective intelligence by weighting and aggregating contributions from large developer populations, combining them with algorithmic coordination mechanisms derived from swarm intelligence, and embedding feedback loops across the software development lifecycle. Empirical case studies, including applications in matrix computation and aerospace domains, indicate that collective intelligence can be systematically harnessed to scale program synthesis beyond function-level code toward fully integrated software systems.

=== Cognition ===
==== Market judgment ====
Because of the Internet's ability to rapidly convey large amounts of information throughout the world, the use of collective intelligence to predict stock prices and stock price direction has become increasingly viable. Websites aggregate stock market information that is as current as possible so professional or amateur stock analysts can publish their viewpoints, enabling amateur investors to submit their financial opinions and create an aggregate opinion. The opinion of all investor can be weighed equally so that a pivotal premise of the effective application of collective intelligence can be applied: the masses, including a broad spectrum of stock market expertise, can be utilized to more accurately predict the behavior of financial markets.

Collective intelligence underpins the efficient-market hypothesis of Eugene Fama – although the term collective intelligence is not used explicitly in his paper. Fama cites research conducted by Michael Jensen in which 89 out of 115 selected funds underperformed relative to the index during the period from 1955 to 1964. But after removing the loading charge (up-front fee) only 72 underperformed while after removing brokerage costs only 58 underperformed. On the basis of such evidence index funds became popular investment vehicles using the collective intelligence of the market, rather than the judgement of professional fund managers, as an investment strategy.

==== Predictions in politics and technology ====
Voting methods used in the United States 2016

Political parties mobilize large numbers of people to form policy, select candidates and finance and run election campaigns. Knowledge focusing through various voting methods allows perspectives to converge through the assumption that uninformed voting is to some degree random and can be filtered from the decision process leaving only a residue of informed consensus. Critics point out that often bad ideas, misunderstandings, and misconceptions are widely held, and that structuring of the decision process must favor experts who are presumably less prone to random or misinformed voting in a given context.

Companies such as Affinnova (acquired by Nielsen), Google, InnoCentive, Marketocracy, and Threadless have successfully employed the concept of collective intelligence in bringing about the next generation of technological changes through their research and development (R&D), customer service, and knowledge management. An example of such application is Google's Project Aristotle in 2012, where the effect of collective intelligence on team makeup was examined in hundreds of the company's R&D teams.

=== Cooperation ===
==== Networks of trust ====
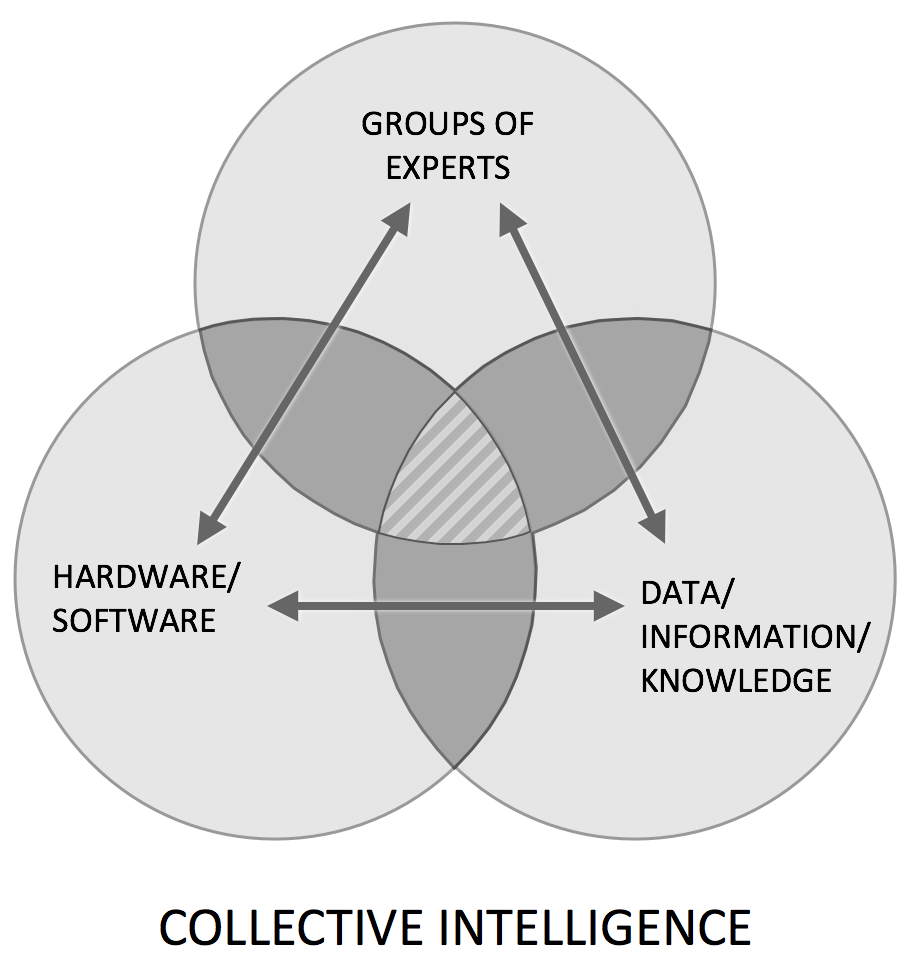
Application of collective intelligence in the Millennium Project

In 2012, the Global Futures Collective Intelligence System (GFIS) was created by The Millennium Project, which epitomizes collective intelligence as the synergistic intersection among data/information/knowledge, software/hardware, and expertise/insights that has a recursive learning process for better decision-making than the individual players alone.

New media are often associated with the promotion and enhancement of collective intelligence. The ability of new media to easily store and retrieve information, predominantly through databases and the Internet, allows for it to be shared without difficulty. Thus, through interaction with new media, knowledge easily passes between sources resulting in a form of collective intelligence. The use of interactive new media, particularly the internet, promotes online interaction and this distribution of knowledge between users.

Francis Heylighen, Valentin Turchin, and Gottfried Mayer-Kress are among those who view collective intelligence through the lens of computer science and cybernetics. In their view, the Internet enables collective intelligence at the widest, planetary scale, thus facilitating the emergence of a global brain.

The developer of the World Wide Web, Tim Berners-Lee, aimed to promote sharing and publishing of information globally. Later his employer opened up the technology for free use. In the early '90s, the Internet's potential was still untapped, until the mid-1990s when 'critical mass', as termed by the head of the Advanced Research Project Agency (ARPA), Dr. J.C.R. Licklider, demanded more accessibility and utility. The driving force of this Internet-based collective intelligence is the digitization of information and communication. Henry Jenkins, a key theorist of new media and media convergence draws on the theory that collective intelligence can be attributed to media convergence and participatory culture. He criticizes contemporary education for failing to incorporate online trends of collective problem solving into the classroom, stating "whereas a collective intelligence community encourages ownership of work as a group, schools grade individuals". Jenkins argues that interaction within a knowledge community builds vital skills for young people, and teamwork through collective intelligence communities contribute to the development of such skills. Collective intelligence is not merely a quantitative contribution of information from all cultures, it is also qualitative.

Lévy and de Kerckhove consider CI from a mass communications perspective, focusing on the ability of networked information and communication technologies to enhance the community knowledge pool. They suggest that these communications tools enable humans to interact and to share and collaborate with both ease and speed. With the development of the Internet and its widespread use, the opportunity to contribute to knowledge-building communities, such as Wikipedia, is greater than ever before. These computer networks give participating users the opportunity to store and to retrieve knowledge through the collective access to these databases and allow them to "harness the hive" Researchers at the MIT Center for Collective Intelligence research and explore collective intelligence of groups of people and computers.

In this context collective intelligence is often confused with shared knowledge. The former is the sum total of information held individually by members of a community while the latter is information that is believed to be true and known by all members of the community. Collective intelligence as represented by Web 2.0 has less user engagement than collaborative intelligence. An art project using Web 2.0 platforms is "Shared Galaxy", an experiment developed by an anonymous artist to create a collective identity that shows up as one person on several platforms like MySpace, Facebook, YouTube and Second Life. The password is written in the profiles and the accounts named "Shared Galaxy" are open to be used by anyone. In this way many take part in being one. Another art project using collective intelligence to produce artistic work is Curatron, where a large group of artists together decides on a smaller group that they think would make a good collaborative group. The process is used based on an algorithm computing the collective preferences In creating what he calls 'CI-Art', Nova Scotia based artist Mathew Aldred follows Pierry Lévy's definition of collective intelligence. Aldred's CI-Art event in March 2016 involved over four hundred people from the community of Oxford, Nova Scotia, and internationally. Later work developed by Aldred used the UNU swarm intelligence system to create digital drawings and paintings. The Oxford Riverside Gallery (Nova Scotia) held a public CI-Art event in May 2016, which connected with online participants internationally.

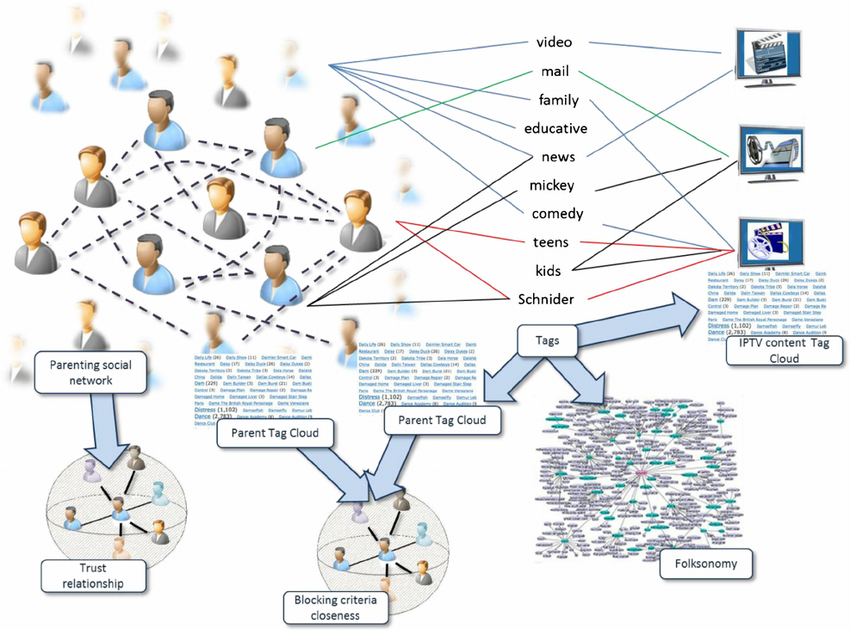
Parenting social network and collaborative tagging as pillars for automatic IPTV content blocking system

In social bookmarking (also called collaborative tagging), users assign tags to resources shared with other users, which gives rise to a type of information organisation that emerges from this crowdsourcing process. The resulting information structure can be seen as reflecting the collective knowledge (or collective intelligence) of a community of users and is commonly called a "Folksonomy", and the process can be captured by models of collaborative tagging.

Recent research using data from the social bookmarking website Delicious, has shown that collaborative tagging systems exhibit a form of complex systems (or self-organizing) dynamics. Although there is no central controlled vocabulary to constrain the actions of individual users, the distributions of tags that describe different resources has been shown to converge over time to a stable power law distributions. Once such stable distributions form, examining the correlations between different tags can be used to construct simple folksonomy graphs, which can be efficiently partitioned to obtained a form of community or shared vocabularies. Such vocabularies can be seen as a form of collective intelligence, emerging from the decentralised actions of a community of users. The Wall-it Project is also an example of social bookmarking.

==== P2P business ====
Research performed by Tapscott and Williams has provided a few examples of the benefits of collective intelligence to business:

Talent utilization
At the rate technology is changing, no firm can fully keep up in the innovations needed to compete. Instead, smart firms are drawing on the power of mass collaboration to involve participation of the people they could not employ. This also helps generate continual interest in the firm in the form of those drawn to new idea creation as well as investment opportunities.
Demand creation
Firms can create a new market for complementary goods by engaging in open-source community. Firms also are able to expand into new fields that they previously would not have been able to without the addition of resources and collaboration from the community. This creates, as mentioned before, a new market for complementary goods for the products in said new fields.
Costs reduction
Mass collaboration can help to reduce costs dramatically. Firms can release a specific software or product to be evaluated or debugged by online communities. The results will be more personal, robust and error-free products created in a short amount of time and costs. New ideas can also be generated and explored by collaboration of online communities creating opportunities for free R&D outside the confines of the company.

==== Open-source software ====
Cultural theorist and online community developer, John Banks considered the contribution of online fan communities in the creation of the Trainz product. He argued that its commercial success was fundamentally dependent upon "the formation and growth of an active and vibrant online fan community that would both actively promote the product and create content- extensions and additions to the game software".

The increase in user created content and interactivity gives rise to issues of control over the game itself and ownership of the player-created content. This gives rise to fundamental legal issues, highlighted by Lessig and Bray and Konsynski, such as intellectual property and property ownership rights.

Gosney extends this issue of Collective Intelligence in videogames one step further in his discussion of alternate reality gaming. This genre, he describes as an "across-media game that deliberately blurs the line between the in-game and out-of-game experiences" as events that happen outside the game reality "reach out" into the player's lives in order to bring them together. Solving the game requires "the collective and collaborative efforts of multiple players"; thus the issue of collective and collaborative team play is essential to ARG. Gosney argues that the Alternate Reality genre of gaming dictates an unprecedented level of collaboration and "collective intelligence" in order to solve the mystery of the game.

==== Benefits of co-operation ====
Co-operation helps to solve most important and interesting multi-science problems. In his book, James Surowiecki mentioned that most scientists think that benefits of co-operation have much more value when compared to potential costs. Co-operation also works because it ensures a number of different viewpoints. Due to technology, global co-operation is simpler and more productive than before.

For example, why do scientists co-operate? Science has become more and more isolated and each science field has spread even more and it is impossible for one person to be aware of all developments. This is true especially in experimental research where highly advanced equipment requires special skills. With co-operation scientists can use information from different fields and use it effectively instead of gathering all the information just by reading by themselves."

=== Coordination ===
==== Ad-hoc communities ====
Military, trade unions, and corporations satisfy some definitions of CI – the most rigorous definition would require a capacity to respond to very arbitrary conditions without orders or guidance from "law" or "customers" to constrain actions. Online advertising companies are using collective intelligence to bypass traditional marketing and creative agencies.

The UNU open platform for "human swarming" (or "social swarming") establishes real-time closed-loop systems around groups of networked users molded after biological swarms, enabling human participants to behave as a unified collective intelligence. When connected to UNU, groups of distributed users collectively answer questions and make predictions in real-time. Early testing shows that human swarms can out-predict individuals. In 2016, an UNU swarm was challenged by a reporter to predict the winners of the Kentucky Derby, and successfully picked the first four horses, in order, beating 540 to 1 odds.

Specialized information sites such as Digital Photography Review or Camera Labs is an example of collective intelligence. Anyone who has an access to the internet can contribute to distributing their knowledge over the world through the specialized information sites.

In learner-generated context a group of users marshal resources to create an ecology that meets their needs often (but not only) in relation to the co-configuration, co-creation and co-design of a particular learning space that allows learners to create their own context. Learner-generated contexts represent an ad hoc community that facilitates coordination of collective action in a network of trust. An example of learner-generated context is found on the Internet when collaborative users pool knowledge in a "shared intelligence space". As the Internet has developed so has the concept of CI as a shared public forum. The global accessibility and availability of the Internet has allowed more people than ever to contribute and access ideas.

Games such as The Sims Series, and Second Life are designed to be non-linear and to depend on collective intelligence for expansion. This way of sharing is gradually evolving and influencing the mindset of the current and future generations. For them, collective intelligence has become a norm. In Terry Flew's discussion of 'interactivity' in the online games environment, the ongoing interactive dialogue between users and game developers, he refers to Pierre Lévy's concept of collective intelligence and argues this is active in videogames as clans or guilds in MMORPG constantly work to achieve goals. Henry Jenkins proposes that the participatory cultures emerging between games producers, media companies, and the end-users mark a fundamental shift in the nature of media production and consumption. Jenkins argues that this new participatory culture arises at the intersection of three broad new media trends. Firstly, the development of new media tools/technologies enabling the creation of content. Secondly, the rise of subcultures promoting such creations, and lastly, the growth of value adding media conglomerates, which foster image, idea and narrative flow.

==== Coordinating collective actions ====
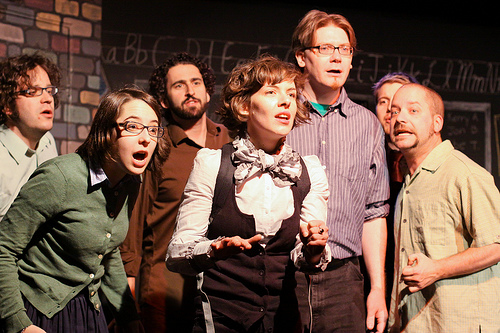
The cast of After School Improv learns an important lesson about improvisation and life.

Improvisational actors also experience a type of collective intelligence which they term "group mind", as theatrical improvisation relies on mutual cooperation and agreement, leading to the unity of "group mind".

Growth of the Internet and mobile telecom has also produced "swarming" or "rendezvous" events that enable meetings or even dates on demand. The full impact has yet to be felt but the anti-globalization movement, for example, relies heavily on e-mail, cell phones, pagers, SMS and other means of organizing. The Indymedia organization does this in a more journalistic way. Such resources could combine into a form of collective intelligence accountable only to the current participants yet with some strong moral or linguistic guidance from generations of contributors – or even take on a more obviously democratic form to advance shared goal.

A further application of collective intelligence is found in the "Community Engineering for Innovations". In such an integrated framework proposed by Ebner et al., idea competitions and virtual communities are combined to better realize the potential of the collective intelligence of the participants, particularly in open-source R&D. In management theory the use of collective intelligence and crowd sourcing leads to innovations and very robust answers to quantitative issues. Therefore, collective intelligence and crowd sourcing is not necessarily leading to the best solution to economic problems, but to a stable, good solution.

==== Coordination in different types of tasks ====
Collective actions or tasks require different amounts of coordination depending on the complexity of the task. Tasks vary from being highly independent simple tasks that require very little coordination to complex interdependent tasks that are built by many individuals and require a lot of coordination. In the article written by Kittur, Lee and Kraut the writers introduce a problem in cooperation: "When tasks require high coordination because the work is highly interdependent, having more contributors can increase process losses, reducing the effectiveness of the group below what individual members could optimally accomplish". Having a team too large the overall effectiveness may suffer even when the extra contributors increase the resources. In the end the overall costs from coordination might overwhelm other costs.

Group collective intelligence is a property that emerges through coordination from both bottom-up and top-down processes. In a bottom-up process the different characteristics of each member are involved in contributing and enhancing coordination. Top-down processes are more strict and fixed with norms, group structures and routines that in their own way enhance the group's collective work.

== Challenges and future directions ==
Collective intelligence systems face significant challenges that threaten their effectiveness, particularly as these systems become more complex and augmented by artificial intelligence.

A core vulnerability is the loss of independent thought due to social influence, which Lorenz et al. (2011) showed can reduce opinion diversity and lead to convergence on inaccurate group judgments. They identified phenomena such as social influence reducing diversity without improving accuracy, range reduction shifting true values, and unwarranted confidence among participants. Emerging collective intelligence platforms increasingly integrate AI to enhance human collaboration. According to Riedl et al. (2025), AI can augment collective intelligence by improving distributed knowledge aggregation, coordinating attention, and facilitating collective reasoning. However, deploying AI at scale introduces challenges including preserving user trust, ensuring equitable representation, facilitating usability, and protecting privacy. The complexity of social dynamics and constant changes in community structure require sophisticated human-centered design principles and governance frameworks to avoid amplifying biases or creating algorithmic monocultures.

Recent work has proposed viewing collective intelligence in terms of "human–machine social systems," in which humans and heterogeneous artificial agents (such as algorithms, bots, and robots) jointly form complex networks whose emergent outcomes cannot be deduced from human or machine behavior alone. Under this perspective, researchers study how different configurations of human–human, human–machine, and machine–machine interactions affect competition, coordination, cooperation, contagion, and collective decision-making, and how design and regulation of these socio-technical ecologies can improve robustness, resilience, and group performance.

Scaling collective intelligence to national or global levels further complicates these issues, demanding robust governance structures and sustainable, transparent AI systems. To maintain robustness in problem-solving around complex global challenges such as climate change or sustainable development, future platforms must carefully balance AI augmentation with human autonomy, diversity, and openness.

== Conferences and workshops ==
The progress made in the rapidly developing field of collective intelligence can be followed via conferences and their proceedings, posters, etc. Conference presentations are usually published afterwards as ‘Proceedings’ and/or made available post-conference on the website.

=== Association for Computing Machinery (ACM) ===
The ACM Collective Intelligence Conference Series is an interdisciplinary event sponsored by Special Interest Group On Computer-Human Interaction (SIGCHI). It is for academics, businesspeople, nonprofits, government policymakers etc. to share insights and ideas relevant to understanding and designing collective intelligence in its many forms in order to promote its use.

=== Santa Fe Institute ===
The Santa Fe Institute held a workshop in 2021 called “Frontiers in Collective Intelligence.” It brought together researchers from computer science, biology, social science and philosophy to survey current work and identify research frontiers. The report synthesised talks and discussions on topics such as agent-based models of analogy making, collective computation and coarse-graining, neural and cortical accounts of distributed cognition, communication costs and benefits, mechanisms for coordination, and applications to misinformation and human–machine collaboration. It highlighted recurring themes for future research, including the role of optimization and modularity, the trade-offs introduced by communication, and the need for interdisciplinary methods to link theory, experiment and application.

=== DIStributed COllective Intelligence Workshop (DISCOLI) ===
The DISCOLI (DIStributed COLlective Intelligence) workshop series is an annual academic forum, first held in 2022, that brings together researchers and practitioners working on distributed and engineered forms of collective intelligence. Typically co-located with conferences such as the International Conference on Distributed Computing Systems (ICDCS) and Distributed Computing in Smart Systems (DCOSS), DISCOLI focuses on algorithms and architectures for self-organising and multi-agent systems, human-AI socio-technical collaborations, extraction of collective knowledge in Internet of Things deployments, programming and verification of emergent behaviour, and related engineering challenges. Editions have been held in Bologna (2022), Pafos (2023), Abu Dhabi (2024) and Tuscany (2025), with a fifth edition planned for 2026.

=== Computational Collective Intelligence (ICCCI) ===
The International Conference on Computational Collective Intelligence (ICCCI) is an established annual conference focusing on computational and applied aspects of collective intelligence. Since the late 2000s the series has published proceedings (Springer) under themes such as computational collective intelligence, semantic web, social networks, multi-agent systems and applications. Recent ICCCI editions have included conferences in Hammamet (2022), Rhodes (2021), Budapest (2023), Leipzig (2024) and Ho Chi Minh City (2025). ICCCI serves as a principal venue for computational, algorithmic and application-oriented CI research with an emphasis on methods, evaluation and deployment of large-scale CI systems.

=== International Symposium on Educating for Collective Intelligence ===
The First International Symposium on Educating for Collective Intelligence, convened by the Connected Intelligence Centre (University of Technology Sydney) on 5–6 December 2024, examined pedagogical, technical and ethical approaches to cultivating collective-intelligence capacities in education. The symposium brought together researchers and practitioners to discuss topics such as pedagogies for CI, design of educational technologies that support shared situational awareness and collective problem solving, methods for assessing CI in learning contexts, and the role of AI in supporting collaborative cognition. Keynote speakers included scholars working on CI education and learning analytics. The event is cited as an example of an emergent research and practice community focused on “education for CI” that links education, learning-analytics, and CI research agendas.

== See also ==
=== Similar concepts and applications ===
- Citizen science
- Civic intelligence
- Collaborative fiction
- Collaborative filtering
- Collaborative innovation network
- Collective decision-making
- Collective effervescence
- Collective memory
- Collective problem solving
- Crowd psychology
- Global Consciousness Project
- Group behaviour
- Group mind (science fiction)
- Knowledge ecosystem
- Open-source intelligence
- Prediction market
- Recommendation system
- Smart mob
- Social commerce
- Social epistemology
- Social information processing
- Stigmergy
- Swarm intelligence
- Syntality
- Wisdom of the crowd
- Think tank
- Wiki
- Wikipedia

=== Computation and computer science ===
- Bees algorithm
- Cellular automaton
- Cognitive model § Mother-fetus cognitive model
- Collaborative human interpreter
- Collaborative software
- Connectivity (graph theory)
- Enterprise bookmarking
- Human-based computation
- Open-source software
- Organismic computing
- Preference elicitation

=== Others ===
- Customer engagement
- Dispersed knowledge
- Distributed cognition
- Facilitation (business)
- Facilitator
- Group cognition
- Hundredth monkey effect
- Intersubjectivity
- Keeping up with the Joneses
- Library
- Library of Alexandria
- Meme
- Open-space meeting
- Shared intentionality
- Situated cognition
