= Alex Tapscott =

Canadian business author, and advisor (born 1986)

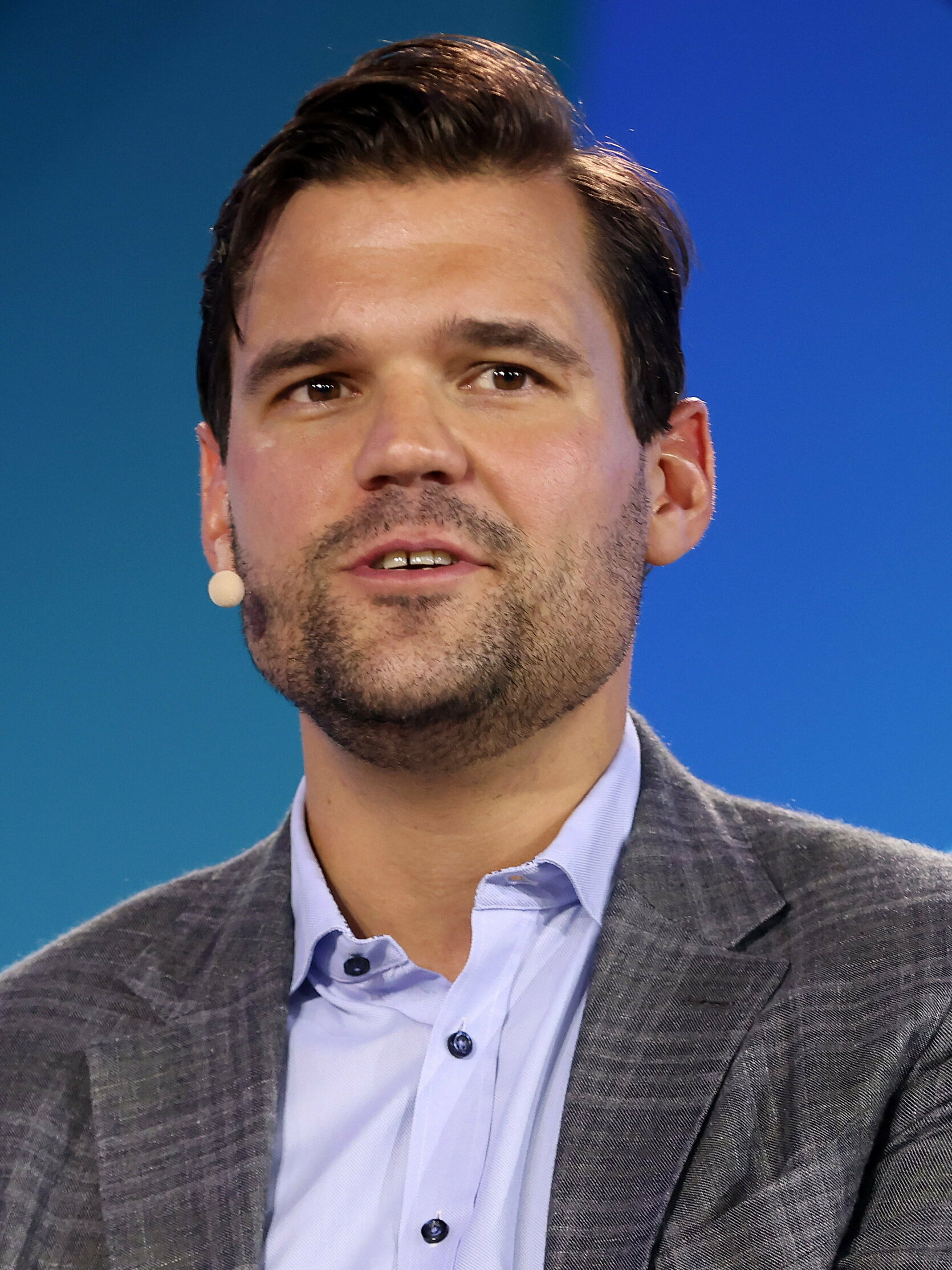
- Tapscott in 2023
- Born: 1986 (age 39–40); Toronto, Ontario, Canada
- Occupations: CEO, CMCC Global Capital Markets
- Parent(s): Don Tapscott, Ana Paula Lopes
- Website: www.alextapscott.com

Alex Tapscott (born 1986) is a Canadian cryptocurrency investor and writer.

He was the CEO and founder of NextBlock Global, a Canadian cryptocurrency investment company which shut down in 2017, and is the co-founder, with his father Don Tapscott, of the Blockchain Research Institute.

== Early life and education ==
Tapscott was born in Toronto and attended Upper Canada College. Tapscott was a member and captain of the Canadian Men's Rugby Under-21 Team in 2006 and 2007. He holds a BA in Law, Jurisprudence and Social thought from Amherst College in Amherst, Massachusetts where he graduated in 2008.

== Career ==
Tapscott co-authored, with his father Don Tapscott, the 2016 book Blockchain Revolution: How the Technology Behind Bitcoin is Changing Money, Business, and the World. The book became a The Globe and Mail as well as Toronto Star bestseller. Financial Times reviewed the book and wrote "The Tapscotts provide a thorough, balanced and enlightening guide to the next big thing",.

Tapscott sits on the Advisory Board to Elections Canada, a non-partisan agency responsible for conducting federal elections and referendums.

In the summer of 2016, Tapscott co-convened a meeting of blockchain stakeholders in Muskoka, Ontario to discuss governance of the whole blockchain ecosystem.

On November 5, 2017, he announced that NextBlock was forced to scrap IPO plans due to being dropped by their underwriter, CIBC, after the company is reported to have made false and misleading statements in its marketing materials. Tapscott and NextBlock settled charges with the SEC in 2019.

== Bibliography ==
- Web3: Charting the Internet’s Next Economic and Cultural Frontier. HarperCollins, 2023. ISBN 978-0063299955
- Blockchain Revolution: How the Technology Behind Bitcoin is Changing Money, Business, and the World, PenguinRandomHouse, 2016. ISBN 978-0670069972.
- To the Breaking Point: Law and Political Emergency, UD-ALO Publishing, 2010. ISBN 978-0994042002
