= Radical transparency =

Concept used in government, business, technology, and education

Radical transparency is a terminology used across fields of governance, politics, software design and business to describe actions and approaches that radically increase the openness of organizational process and data. Its usage was originally understood as an approach or act that uses abundant networked information to access previously confidential organizational process or outcome data.

== History and uses ==
Modern usage of the term radical transparency coincided with increased public use of Information communications technologies including the Internet. Kevin Kelly argued in 1994 that, "in the network era, openness wins, central control is lost." David Brin's writing on The Transparent Society re-imagined the societal consequences of radical transparency remixing Orwell's 1984. However, the explicit political argument for "radical transparency" was first made in a 2001 Foreign Affairs article on information and communication technology driving economic growth in developing regions. In 2006, Chris Anderson from Wired blogged on the shift from secrecy to transparency blogging culture had made on corporate communications, and highlighted the next step as a shift to "radical transparency" where the "whole product development process [is] laid bare, and opened to customer input." By 2008, the term was being used to describe the WikiLeaks platform that radically decentralized the power, voices and visibility of governance knowledge that was previously secret. Ray Dalio at Bridgewater Associates wrote about the concept in his 2017 book, Principles.

== Contexts ==
=== Radical corporate transparency ===
Radical corporate transparency, as a philosophical concept, would involve removing all barriers to free and easy public access to corporate, political and personal (treating persons as corporations) information and the development of laws, rules, social connivance and processes that facilitate and protect such an outcome.

Using these methods to 'hold corporations accountable for the benefit of everyone' was emphasised in Tapscott and Ticoll's book "The Naked Corporation" in 2003. Radical transparency has also been explained by Dan Goleman as a management approach where (ideally,) all decision making is carried out publicly. Specific to this approach is the potential for new technologies to reveal the eco-impact of products bought to steer consumers to make informed decisions and companies to reform their business practices.

In traditional public relations management, damage control involved the suppression of public information. But, as observed by Clive Thompson in Wired, the Internet has created a force towards transparency: "[H]ere's the interesting paradox: The reputation economy creates an incentive to be more open, not less. Since Internet commentary is inescapable, the only way to influence it is to be part of it. Being transparent, opening up, posting interesting material frequently and often is the only way to amass positive links to yourself and thus to directly influence your Googleable reputation. Putting out more evasion or PR puffery won't work, because people will either ignore it and not link to it – or worse, pick the spin apart and enshrine those criticisms high on your Google list of life." Mark Zuckerberg has opined that "more transparency should make for a more tolerant society in which people eventually accept that everybody sometimes does bad or embarrassing things."

=== Radical political transparency ===
Heemsbergen argues that radical political transparency consists of actors outside of the structures of government, using new media forms, to disclose secrets to the public in ways that were previously unavailable and that create new expectations around how information should be used to govern. A prominent example of these evolutions of democracy was seen in the creation of Hansard in parliaments of the Westminster system, which started in pirate markets of pamphleteers illegally sharing the 'secrets' of what was said in British Parliament. Hansard is now institutionalised in many parliaments, with full records of discussions in parliament recorded and published, while the texts of proposed laws and final laws are all, in principle, public documents.

Since the late 1990s, many national parliaments decided to publish all parliamentary debates and laws on the Internet. However, the initial texts of proposed laws and the discussions and negotiations regarding them generally occur in parliamentary commissions, which are rarely transparent, and among political parties, which are very rarely transparent. Moreover, given the logical and linguistic complexity of typical national laws, public participation is difficult despite the radical transparency at the formal parliamentary level.

Radical transparency has also been suggested in the context of government finance and public economics. In Missed Information, Sarokin and Schulkin take the concept even further, advocating for hypertransparency of government decision-making, a situation where all internal records, emails, meeting minutes and other internal information is proactively available to the public. Hypertransparency reverses the current Freedom of Information model of access only upon request, instead making all information available by default unless withheld for limited exemptions such as personal information or national security.

=== Radical educational transparency ===
A radically transparent approach is also emerging within education. Open educational resources (OER) are freely accessible, usually openly licensed documents and media that are useful for teaching, learning, educational, assessment and research purposes. Although some people consider the use of an open format to be an essential characteristic of OER, this is not a universally acknowledged requirement. In addition online courses activities are also becoming increasingly more accessible for others. One example are the new and popular massive open online courses (MOOC).

== See also ==
- Corporate transparency
- E-democracy
- Open business
- Open government
- Open society
- Open source governance
- Open education
