= Corporate transparency =

Aspect of open corporate governance

Corporate transparency describes the extent to which a corporation's actions are observable by outsiders. This is a consequence of regulation, local norms, and the set of information, privacy, and business policies concerning corporate decision-making and operations openness to employees, stakeholders, shareholders and the general public. From the perspective of outsiders, transparency can be defined simply as the perceived quality of intentionally shared information from the corporation.

Recent research suggests there are three primary dimensions of corporate transparency: information disclosure, clarity, and accuracy. To increment transparency, corporations infuse greater disclosure, clarity, and accuracy into their communications with stakeholders. For example, governance decisions to voluntarily share information related to the firm's ecological impact with environmental activists indicate disclosure; decisions to actively limit the use of technical terminology, fine print, or complicated mathematical notations in the firm's correspondence with suppliers and customers indicate clarity; and decisions to not bias, embellish, or otherwise distort known facts in the firm's communications with investors indicate accuracy. The strategic management of transparency, therefore, involves intentional modifications in disclosure, clarity, and accuracy to accomplish the firm's objectives.

High levels of corporate transparency can have positive impact on companies. It is known that high levels of corporate transparency improve investment efficiency and resource allocation. Companies with great corporate transparency are expected to enjoy lower cost of external financing resulting in more opportunities for growth. Next, transparency can lead to better reflection of company specifications in the stock prices and greater extent of monitoring by outside investors. Internally, corporate transparency has been shown to increase employee trust in the organization. Among other benefits of corporate transparency are lower transaction costs and greater stock liquidity associated with lower cost of capital which in return correlates with an increase in the firm value. On the other hand, low levels of corporate transparency are linked with moral hazard extracting firm resources for private benefit. This causes principal–agent problem and worsens firm performance.

Standard & Poor's has included a definition of corporate transparency in its Gamma methodology aimed at analysis and assessment of corporate governance. As a part of this work, Standard & Poor's Governance Services publishes a transparency index which calculates the average score for the largest public companies in various countries.

The increasing prevalence of international sanctions further increases the importance of corporate transparency. Opaque SME's, including corporate black listing firms operating in stricter regulatory environments like the UK - such as Blacklist Aero (trading name 'AirJustice Ltd') in the aviation sector - often have unclear funding sources and could operate to serve the interests of sanctioned entities or actors against larger legally compliant organisations.

== Customer support transparency ==
Corporations may be transparent to investors, the public at large, and to customers.

Opening up the customer support channels may mean using a feedback tool which allows users to publicly vote on new developments, having an open internet forum, or actively responding to social media questions.

== European Union ==
Standards concerning corporate transparency in European Union are scrutinized under Directive 2014/95/EU, referred to as Non-Financial Reporting Directive (NFRD). Under this legislation companies have to disclose information regarding employed practices related to environmental protection, social responsibility and treatment of employees, respect for human rights, anti-corruption and bribery and diversity on company boards (in terms of age, gender, educational and professional background). By 2018, companies are required to include non-financial statements in their annual reports. It was found that 60% companies disclose their non-financial information in their annual reports in contrast to 40% favoring a separate document in 2019.

Businesses with an obligation to publish such information are large public-interest companies with more than 500 employees, which amounts to approximately 6000 companies across European Union. Companies enjoy great flexibility how to disclose relevant information as they can either use international, European or national guidelines. For instance, they can use the UN Global Compact, the OECD guidelines for multinational enterprises or ISO 26000. Despite enclosed suggestions for guidelines, none is referred to by more than 10% of companies. To better understand the situation, companies are expected to describe their business model in relation to sustainability and strategic risks. This might not be reality as only nearly a half of companies mentioned at least one strategic risk related to sustainability and only 7.2% further described how those risks were being addressed in 2019. The most frequently listed risks where related to climate change (24.9%), environmental challenges (23.9%) and labour issues (23.8%).

As of 20 February 2020, the European Commission launched a public consultation on the review of the NFRD.

== China ==
In 2008, researchers found that value maximization might not be the ultimate goal of Chinese listed companies as a result of the Chinese government being the major shareholder of state-owned enterprises (SOE). Comparing listed companies in different markets, it seems that those with sound corporate governance practices tend to showcase relatively good performance, which was in contrast to the situation in the Chinese market. It was believed that implementation of new reforms would result in higher corporate transparency of Chinese firms.

In 2002, the China Securities Regulatory Commission (CSRC) issued a code of corporate governance affecting practices and structures employed by Chinese firms. One year later, the CSRC allowed qualified foreign institutional investors (QFII) to enter the Chinese stock market. It was found that QFIIs have greater control over state shareholders in state-owned companies than domestic mutual funds and are more prone to act as unbiased monitoring body.

Institutional ownership has positive effect on both, corporate governance transparency and accounting information transparency. However, there is not sufficient amount of evidence to support the claim that higher levels of corporate transparency lead to higher levels of institutional ownership in China.

== Taiwan ==
Corporate transparency in Taiwan is assessed using Information Disclosure and Transparency Ranking System (IDTRS) launched in 2003 by Securities and Futures Institute. Whole process is on voluntary basis with evaluation executed annually in two-stage process where the ranking committee and companies with possibility of expressing their opinions participate.

Capital markets in Taiwan evolved over the recent decades from ones with insufficient protection of shareholders and stock market instability to markets with plausible transparency practices. Establishing IDTRS has increased the level of corporate transparency and information disclosure by Taiwanese companies. Their motivation is driven by the likelihood of their transparency ranking being made public and possible consequences of such action. Disclosing more information mediates information asymmetry, prevents moral hazard and can lead to higher liquidity and lower cost of capital. Ultimately, IDTRS has been successful in stimulating companies to disclose more information, increasing firm value and improving quality of forecasts of firm's performance in stock market.

== United Kingdom ==
The United Kingdom government undertook consultation exercises in 2020 concerning proposed improvements to the quality and value of financial information on the UK companies register, the powers of the registrar and a ban on companies having corporate directors. It then issued a white paper on Corporate Transparency and Register Reform in February 2022, which sought to reflect the government's responses to these consultations.

== United States ==
The Corporate Transparency Act (CTA), part of the National Defense Authorization Act for Fiscal Year 2021, introduced "beneficial ownership information reporting requirements" for companies in the United States. The law requires businesses to disclose their beneficial owners to the U.S. Department of Treasury in an effort to curb illegal economic activities. On December 3, 2024, Amos Mazzant, Federal Judge for the United States District Court for the Eastern District of Texas, enjoined the Government from enforcing the Corporate Transparency Act and its Implementing Regulations, including the beneficial ownership information reporting requirements. The U.S. Court of Appeals for the Fifth Circuit affirmed the nationwide injunction. On December 31, 2024, the U.S. Department of Justice appealed to the U.S. Supreme Court, seeking to stay the injunction. On January 23, 2025, the Supreme Court ruled that the Government can enforce the CTA while the Fifth Circuit Court reviews the law. In March 2025, the U.S. Department of Treasury announced that they would halt any enforcement or penalties on domestic businesses and make further adjustments to focus primarily on foreign reporting companies.

== Emerging countries ==
Countries with multi-party legislatures are associated with higher levels of corporate transparency. Furthermore, when a country transitions to multi-party legislature, opacity is expected to decrease.

Comparing democracies and authoritarian regimes, we can expect that firms are more transparent in democratic countries. Levels of corporate transparency are decreasing as we go from democracies to countries with semi-competitive authoritarian regimes. Lastly, firms in countries with non-competitive authoritarian regimes display the greatest opacity.

When a regime changes from non-competitive authoritarian one to semi-competitive, corporate transparency tends to improve. However, this trend does not hold if a country transitions from a semi-competitive authoritarian regime to democracy.

== See also ==
- Open business
- Radical transparency
- Corporate governance
- Transparency Report
