= Organismic computing =

Form of engineered human computation

Organismic computing is a form of engineered human computation that employs technology to enable "shared sensing, collective reasoning, and coordinated action" within human groups toward goal-directed behavior. This biomimetic approach to augmenting group efficacy seeks to improve synergy by allowing a group of individuals to function as a single intelligent superorganism.

== Rationale ==
For many tasks, increasing the size of a group leads to diminishing returns. That is, each new person contributes less to overall group performance. This suggests that the benefit-cost ratio associated with adding a new person decreases as the group gets larger. The organismic approach to augmenting group efficacy seeks to leverage the quadratic growth in the number of possible relationships among group members, as described by Metcalfe's law. By increasing the number of relationships realized and by sufficiently increasing the utility of those relationship, each new group member would add more value to the group than previous members.

== Approach ==
The organismic model of group efficacy assumes that enabling real-time distributed sensing, reasoning, and acting, using the right augmentation methods, will increase group efficacy via synergistic effects that result from more and improved connections among individuals in a group. Indeed, organismic computing research is focused primarily on the pursuit of augmentation methods that are optimal for different applications of group behavior. Additionally, the application space may dictate a greater emphasis on one of the following members of the "synergistic triad".

=== Shared sensing ===
Shared sensing is the notion that individual or aggregated sensory experiences are shared in real-time across members of a group, toward greater awareness of information relevant to an individual's goals.

=== Collective reasoning ===
Collective reasoning includes a broad space of methods that enable the creation and dissemination of information due to distributed cognition.

=== Coordinated action ===
Coordinated action involves methods that enable effective, synchronous group behaviors.

== Challenges ==
A key challenge in developing effective organismic computing methods is the problem of information overload. Because humans are limited capacity systems, which include both attentional and processing bottlenecks, the availability or imposition of additional information may create interference that reduces goal-related performance.

== Evidence ==
A 2013 pilot study examined performance in a hide-and-seek task within a simulated augmented reality environment. Synergistic effects seemed to increased with group size and level of augmentation. A 2010 collective intelligence study of group problem solving performance revealed strong evidence that "Group IQ" correlated strongly with the social intelligence of each group member and only weakly with individual IQ, suggesting that interaction dynamics among group members is a better predictor of group problem solving performance than individual problem solving abilities.

== Applications ==
Organismic computing, due to its emphasis on agency, is best suited to interaction in the physical, simulated, or augmented world. Thus, potential applications include crisis relief, first response, and counter-terrorism, as well as problem-solving in artificial environments by recasting abstract problems using real-world metaphors.

== See also ==
- Douglas Engelbart
- Global brain
