= Wikinomics =

Book by Don Tapscott

Wikinomics: How Mass Collaboration Changes Everything
- Front cover
- Author: Don Tapscott, Anthony D. Williams
- Language: English
- Subject: Business networking
- Publisher: Portfolio
- Publication date: December 2006
- Publication place: United States
- Media type: Print (hardcover)
- Pages: 324 p.
- ISBN: 1-59184-138-0
- OCLC: 318389282
- Dewey Decimal: 658/.046 22
- LC Class: HD69.S8 T37 2006

Wikinomics: How Mass Collaboration Changes Everything is a book by Don Tapscott and Anthony D. Williams, first published in December 2006. It explores how some companies in the early 21st century have used mass collaboration and open-source technology, such as wikis, to be successful.

The term 'Wikinomics' describes the effects of extensive collaboration and user-participation and how relationships between businesses and markets have changed as a result.

== Concepts ==
According to Tapscott, the use of mass collaboration in a business environment in recent history can be seen as an extension of the trend in business to outsource: externalize formerly internal business functions to other business entities. The difference however is that instead of an organized business body brought into being specifically for a unique function, mass collaboration relies on free individual agents to come together and cooperate to improve a given operation or solve a problem. This kind of outsourcing is also referred to as crowdsourcing, to reflect this difference. This can be incentivized by a reward system, though it is not required.

The book also discusses seven new models of mass collaboration, including:

- Peering: For example, page 24, "Marketocracy employs a form of peering in a mutual fund (Mutual fund: MOFQX) that harnesses the collective intelligence of the investment community... Though not completely open source, it is an example of how meritocratic, peer-to-peer models are seeping into an industry where conventional wisdom favors the lone super-star stock advisor."
- Ideagoras: For example, page 98, linking experts with unsolved research and development problems. The company InnoCentive is a consulting group that encapsulates the idea of ideagoras.
- Prosumers: For example, page 125, where it discusses the social video game Second Life as being created by its customers. When customers are also the producers, you have the phenomenon: Prosumer.
- New Alexandrians: This idea is about the Internet and sharing knowledge.

The last chapter is written by viewers, and was opened for editing on February 5, 2007.

=== Central concepts of wikinomics in the enterprise ===
According to Tapscott and Williams, these four principles are the central concepts of wikinomics in the enterprise:

1. Openness – which includes not only open standards and content but also financial transparency and an open attitude towards external ideas and resources;
2. Peering – which replaces hierarchical models with a more collaborative forum. Tapscott and Williams cite the development of Linux as the "quintessential example of peering";
3. Sharing – which is a less proprietary approach to (among other things) products, intellectual property, bandwidth, scientific knowledge;
4. Acting globally – which involves embracing globalization and ignoring "physical and geographical boundaries" at both the corporate and individual level.

=== Coase's Law ===
In the chapter The Perfect Storm, the authors give an overview of the economic effects of the kind of transactions Web 2.0 permits. According to the authors, Coase's Law (see Ronald Coase) governs the expansion of a business:

A firm will tend to expand until the cost of organizing an extra transaction within the firm become equal to the costs of carrying out the same transaction on the open market.

However, because of the changing usage patterns of Internet technologies, the cost of transactions has dropped so significantly that the authors assert that the market is better described by an inversion of Coase's Law. That is:

A firm will tend to expand until the cost of carrying out an extra transaction on the open market become equal to the costs of organizing the same transaction within the firm.

Thus, the authors think that with the costs of communicating dramatically dropping, firms that do not change their current structures will perish. Companies who use mass collaboration will dominate their respective markets.

== Reception ==
A review of this book in the Harvard Business Review states "like its title, the book's prose can fall into breathless hype." A review of this book in Choice recommends the book for "general readers and practitioners," but cautions that the authors "present an optimistic overview of successful collaborations and business ventures", "use unique terms (e.g., marketocracy, prosumption, knowledge commons)", should have given "more consideration [to] the darker sides of human motivation as well as groupthink and mass mediocrity", and "primarily draw on their own observations of businesses and trends for the ideas presented".

Tapscott and Williams released a followup to Wikinomics, titled Macrowikinomics: Rebooting Business and the World, on September 28, 2010.

== See also ==
- Bibliography of Wikipedia
- Business Intelligence 2.0 (BI 2.0)
- Cory Doctorow
- File sharing
- Financial crisis
- Free: The Future of a Radical Price, by Chris Anderson
- FreeBSD
- Human-based computation
- Linux
- Mutualism (economic theory)
- Open business
- Open-source economics
- Participatory organization
- Stigmergy
- The Cathedral and the Bazaar, an essay by Eric S. Raymond on software engineering methods
- Theory of value (economics)
