= Superorganism =

Group of synergistic organisms

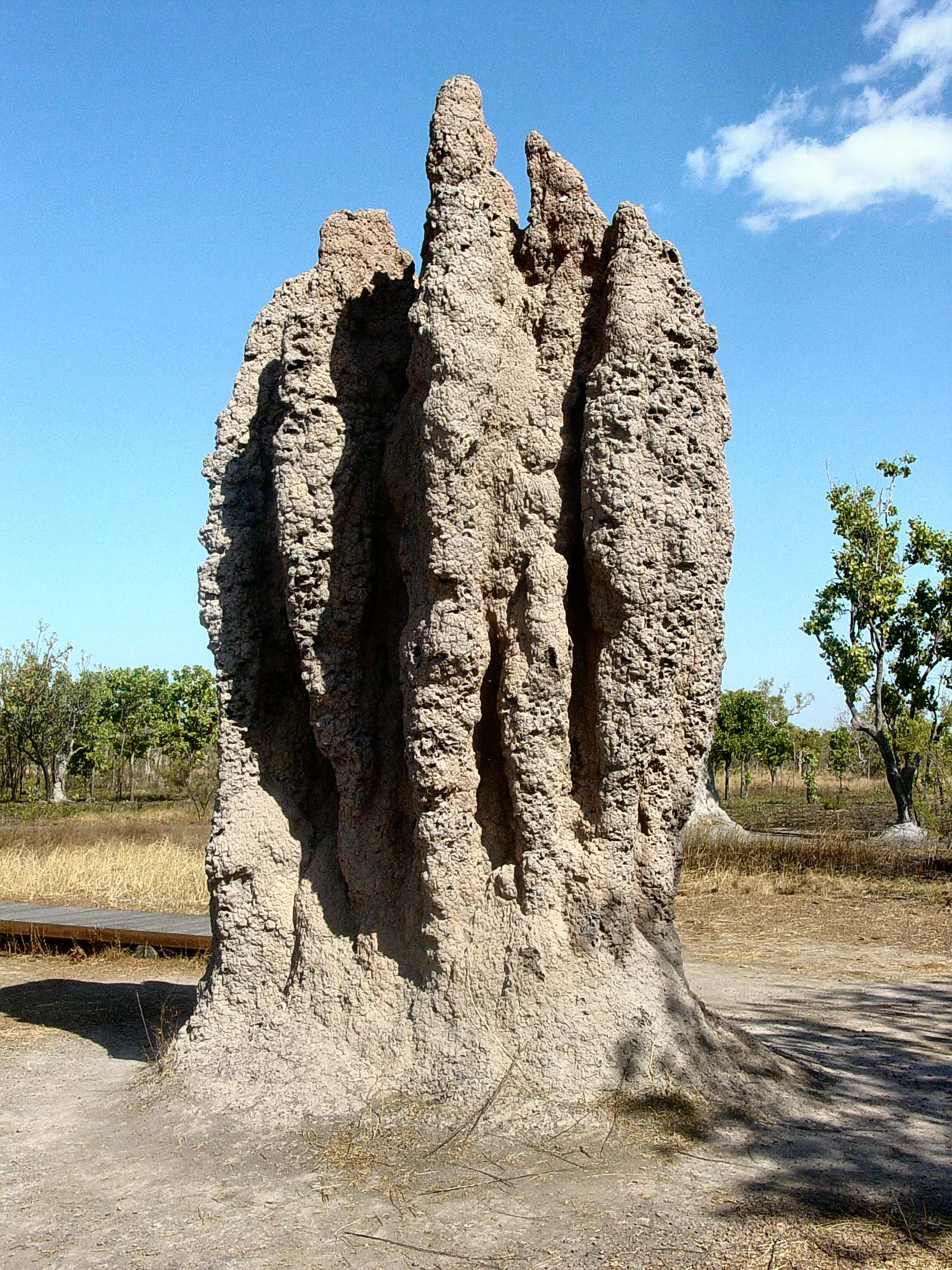
A mound built by cathedral termites

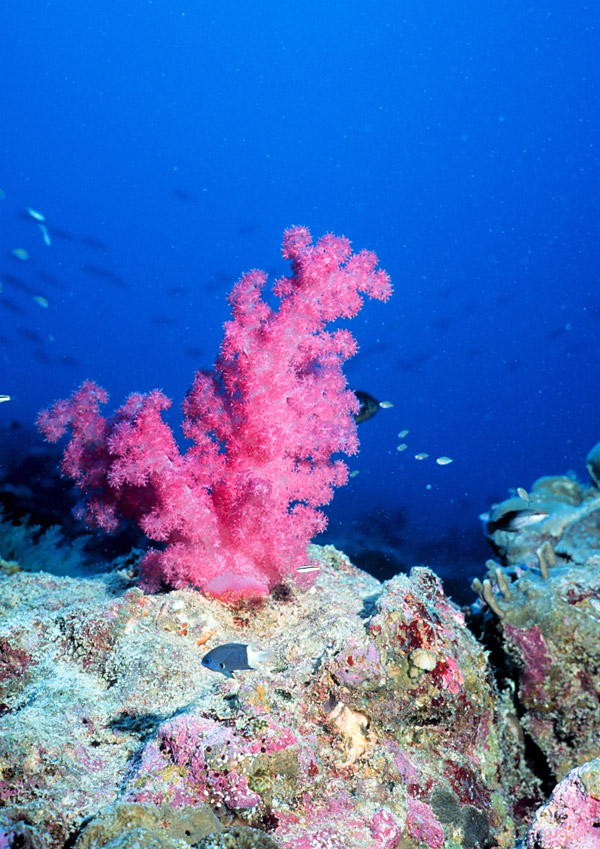
A coral colony

A superorganism, or supraorganism, is a group of synergetically interacting organisms of the same species. A community of synergetically interacting organisms of different species is called a holobiont. The origins of superorganism is widely regarded as a major evolutionary transition along with the origins of multicellular organism and the parallels between their points of no return are stressed.

== Concept ==
The term superorganism is used most often to describe a social unit of eusocial animals in which division of labour is highly specialised and individuals cannot survive by themselves for extended periods. Ants are the best-known example of such a superorganism. A superorganism can be defined as "a collection of agents which can act in concert to produce phenomena governed by the collective", phenomena being any activity "the hive wants" such as ants collecting food and avoiding predators, or bees choosing a new nest site. In challenging environments, micro organisms collaborate and evolve together to process unlikely sources of nutrients such as methane. This process called syntrophy ("eating together") might be linked to the evolution of eukaryote cells and involved in the emergence or maintenance of life forms in challenging environments on Earth and possibly other planets. Superorganisms tend to exhibit homeostasis, power law scaling, persistent disequilibrium and emergent behaviours.

The term was coined in 1789 by James Hutton, the "father of geology", to refer to Earth in the context of geophysiology. The Gaia hypothesis of James Lovelock, and Lynn Margulis as well as the work of Hutton, Vladimir Vernadsky and Guy Murchie, have suggested that the biosphere itself can be considered a superorganism, but that has been disputed. This view relates to systems theory and the dynamics of a complex system.

The concept of a superorganism raises the question of what is to be considered an individual. Toby Tyrrell's critique of the Gaia hypothesis argues that Earth's climate system does not resemble an animal's physiological system. Planetary biospheres are not tightly regulated in the same way that animal bodies are: "planets, unlike animals, are not products of evolution. Therefore we are entitled to be highly skeptical (or even outright dismissive) about whether to expect something akin to a 'superorganism'". He concludes that "the superorganism analogy is unwarranted".

Some scientists have suggested that individual human beings can be thought of as "superorganisms"; as a typical human digestive system contains 10^{13} to 10^{14} microorganisms whose collective genome, the microbiome studied by the Human Microbiome Project, contains at least 100 times as many genes as the human genome itself. Scholars who consider individual cells as organisms, consider all multicellular organisms as superorganisms. Salvucci wrote that superorganism is another level of integration that is observed in nature. These levels include the genomic, the organismal and the ecological levels. The genomic structure of organisms reveals the fundamental role of integration and gene shuffling along evolution.

== In social theory ==
The 19th-century thinker Herbert Spencer coined the term super-organic to focus on social organization (the first chapter of his Principles of Sociology is entitled "Super-organic Evolution"), though this was apparently a distinction between the organic and the social, not an identity: Spencer explored the holistic nature of society as a social organism while distinguishing the ways in which society did not behave like an organism. For Spencer, the super-organic was an emergent property of interacting organisms, that is, human beings. And, as has been argued by D. C. Phillips, there is a "difference between emergence and reductionism".

The economist Carl Menger expanded upon the evolutionary nature of much social growth but never abandoned methodological individualism. Many social institutions arose, Menger argued, not as "the result of socially teleological causes, but the unintended result of innumerable efforts of economic subjects pursuing 'individual' interests".

Both Spencer and Menger argued that because individuals choose and act, any social whole should be considered less than an organism, but Menger emphasized that more strongly. Spencer used the organistic idea to engage in extended analysis of social structure and conceded that it was primarily an analogy. For Spencer, the idea of the super-organic best designated a distinct level of social reality above that of biology and psychology, not a one-to-one identity with an organism. Nevertheless, Spencer maintained that "every organism of appreciable size is a society", which has suggested to some that the issue may be terminological.

The term superorganic was adopted by the anthropologist Alfred L. Kroeber in 1917. Social aspects of the superorganism concept are analysed by Alan Marshall in his 2002 book "The Unity of Nature". A later work in social psychology has offered the superorganism metaphor as a unifying framework to understand diverse aspects of human sociality, such as religion, conformity, and social identity processes.

Combined with globalization and technological progress, the concept of human superorganism led to the model of "global superorganism". Francis Heylighen claimed that this model explains our present, fast changing society, and the direction in which it is heading. As human control expands through the biosphere of the Earth, the global superorganism may eventually encompass the Gaia hypothesis. Of all aspects of the global superorganism, Heylighen emphasizes the emergence of a "global brain" in the sense of the global nervous system. The Internet, the network that connects most computers on this planet, forms an embryonic global brain.

British Author, Peter Russell, who coined the term "global brain," drew parallels with earlier evolutionary thresholds: "Just as matter became organized into living cells, and cells collected into multicellular organisms, so might we expect that at some stage human beings will become integrated into some form of global social superorganism."

== In cybernetics ==
Superorganisms are important in cybernetics, particularly biocybernetics, since they are capable of the so-called "distributed intelligence", a system composed of individual agents that have limited intelligence and information. They can pool resources and so can complete goals that are beyond reach of the individuals on their own. Existence of such behavior in organisms has many implications for military and management applications and is being actively researched.

Superorganisms are also considered dependent upon cybernetic governance and processes. This is based on the idea that a biological system – in order to be effective – needs a sub-system of cybernetic communications and control. This is demonstrated in the way a mole rat colony uses functional synergy and cybernetic processes together.

Joël de Rosnay also introduced a concept called "cybionte" to describe cybernetic superorganism. The notion associates superorganism with chaos theory, multimedia technology, and other new developments.

== See also ==
- Collective intelligence
- Gaia hypothesis
- Group mind (science fiction)
- Holobiont
- Organismic computing
- Quorum sensing, collective behaviour of bacteria
- Stigmergy
- Siphonophore

== Literature ==
- Jürgen Tautz, Helga R. Heilmann: The Buzz about Bees – Biology of a Superorganism, Springer-Verlag 2008. ISBN 978-3-540-78727-3
- Bert Hölldobler, E. O. Wilson: "The Superorganism: The Beauty, Elegance, and Strangeness of Insect Societies", W.W. Norton, 2008. ISBN 978-0-393-06704-0
- Selin Kesebir (2012). "The Superorganism Account of Human Sociality How and When Human Groups Are Like Beehives". Personality and Social Psychology Review. 16 (3): 233–261. doi:10.1177/1088868311430834. PMID 22202149. S2CID 9530301. SSRN 1933734.
