= Ana Paula Arendt =

Brazilian diplomat

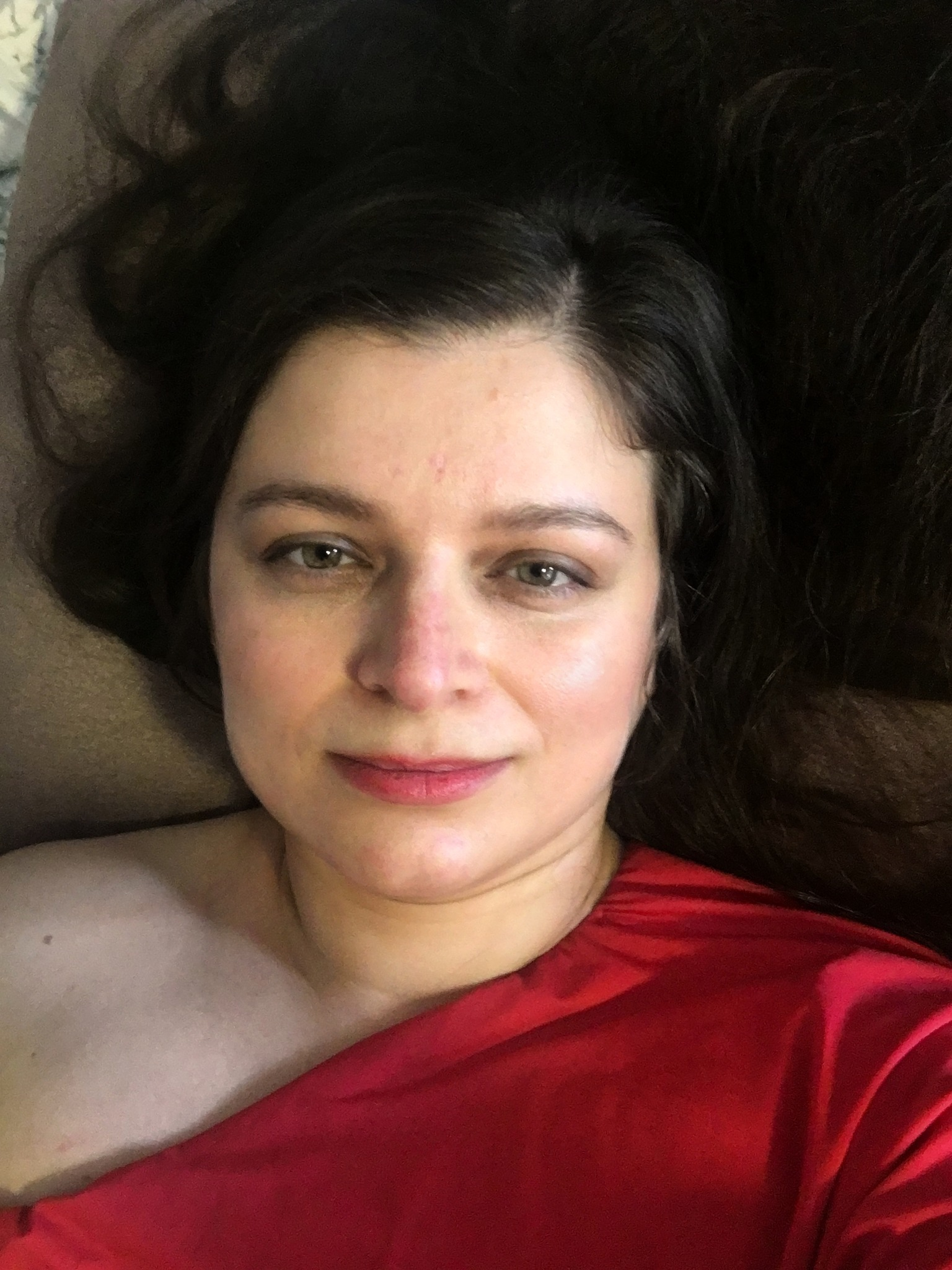

Ana Paula Arendt (born 1980), pseudonym of R. P. Alencar, is a Brazilian writer, poet and diplomat. She is an author of children books, of screenplays, and of poem collections in Portuguese, English, Spanish, French, and other languages. She published Veritas Filia Mendacii Est and To Freedom. Among her most recent works are the awarded play in classical verse The Constituent, the awarded epithalamium "The Venerable Virtues of Man", and Poetry reunited (2014–2018), among other books. She is editor of books and magazines, especially Itapuan Poetry Magazine, bilingual publication in Portuguese and French. She was elected for the Lisbon Academy of Science, Class of Letters, as associate and foreign correspondent member of the New York Academy of Sciences, and admitted in the Brazilian Veteran Naval Fusiliers Association.

== Biography ==
She was born and raised in Rondônia. She's hepta-granddaughter of Bárbara de Alencar. She has lived and moved across many cities of Rondônia, when she was a child, and also in Rio Branco, Acre, where she spent some time at the Kaxarari tribe. Then she moved to Brasília, and São Paulo, where she settled. As a diplomat, she served in short missions in Geneva, Lisbon, Mexico, and Santiago, and during longer missions in Montevideo, Togo (West Africa), Honduras (Central America), and Serbia (Balkans).

== Works ==
=== Marginal poetry ===
- Veritas Filia Mendacii Est ("A Verdade é Filha da Mentira", Rio de Janeiro: Azougue Editorial, 2014)
- To Freedom ("Rumo à Liberdade", Rio de Janeiro: Azougue Editorial, 2014)

=== Individual poems ===
Arendt's poems have been published in literary journals and newspapers, including Literature Today, The Muse and Correio Braziliense. Selected works include:

- "I Love in Portuguese"
- "Shrine"
- "A Child's Chide"
- "Endless"
- "Céu de Brasília"
- "Um estudo sobre os homens violentos"
- "Um estudo sobre o propósito III"
- "Maestra"
- "Três estudos sobre o imaterial"
- "Un sonnet pour un homme"
- "Un étude sur le courage"
- "A Study on Purpose III"

=== Poetry and theatre ===
- The Constituent (2015)
- Callista (2015)
- The Creation of Pindorama (2015)
- The Venerable Virtues of Men (2016)
- Poesia Reunida 2014–2018 (2019)
- Poesia Reunida 2018–2022 (2023)
- Sonetos para minha Pátria (2023)

=== Marginal fiction ===
- Brasil Encantado (3 volumes, Portuguese, 2013)

=== Poetry in other languages ===
- Penthesilea (English, 2014)
- "Suele ser así" (Spanish, 2016)
- "Almost Sonnets" (English, 2016)
- "Wo de Long" (Chinese, 2016)
- "Himne sveta" (Serbian, 2024)

=== Translations ===
Arendt has translated literary works into Portuguese, including:

- Memoirs of the Prince of Talleyrand, vol. 1 (2015)
- Poems by Abhay K., published in Correio Braziliense and other outlets
- "The Art of Political Lying", by Jonathan Swift
- Les enfants du Brésil, by Kangni Alem

=== Essays ===
- The Simple Things of Life (Portuguese, 2016)

Arendt has contributed essays and opinion columns to periodicals such as the Observatório de Comunicação Institucional and Diane Magazine, as well as to publications of the Associação Nacional de Escritores.

=== Screenplays ===
- "The Utopia" (English, 2013)
- "99 Noms de Dieu" (French, 2016)

=== Children's literature ===
- The House of Mommy Marmoset (with C. P. Alencar, Portuguese and French, 2014)
- The Complete Story of the Three Wise Kings (Portuguese, 2013)
- The King and the Fairy (Portuguese, 2013)
- Convention of the Rights of Birds and Nestlings (Portuguese, 2014)
- The Breeze and the Wind (Portuguese, 2015)
- "The Opera of the Ant" (with J. D. P. Alencar, Portuguese, 2019)
- Botanical Fables (Portuguese, 2020)
- The Singularity of Time (with T. A. P. Alencar, Portuguese, 2023)

=== Public appearances ===
Arendt has participated in literary events and poetry readings in Brazil and abroad, including events held in Brasília and Lisbon.
