= Don Tapscott =

Canadian businessman (born 1947)

Don Tapscott CM
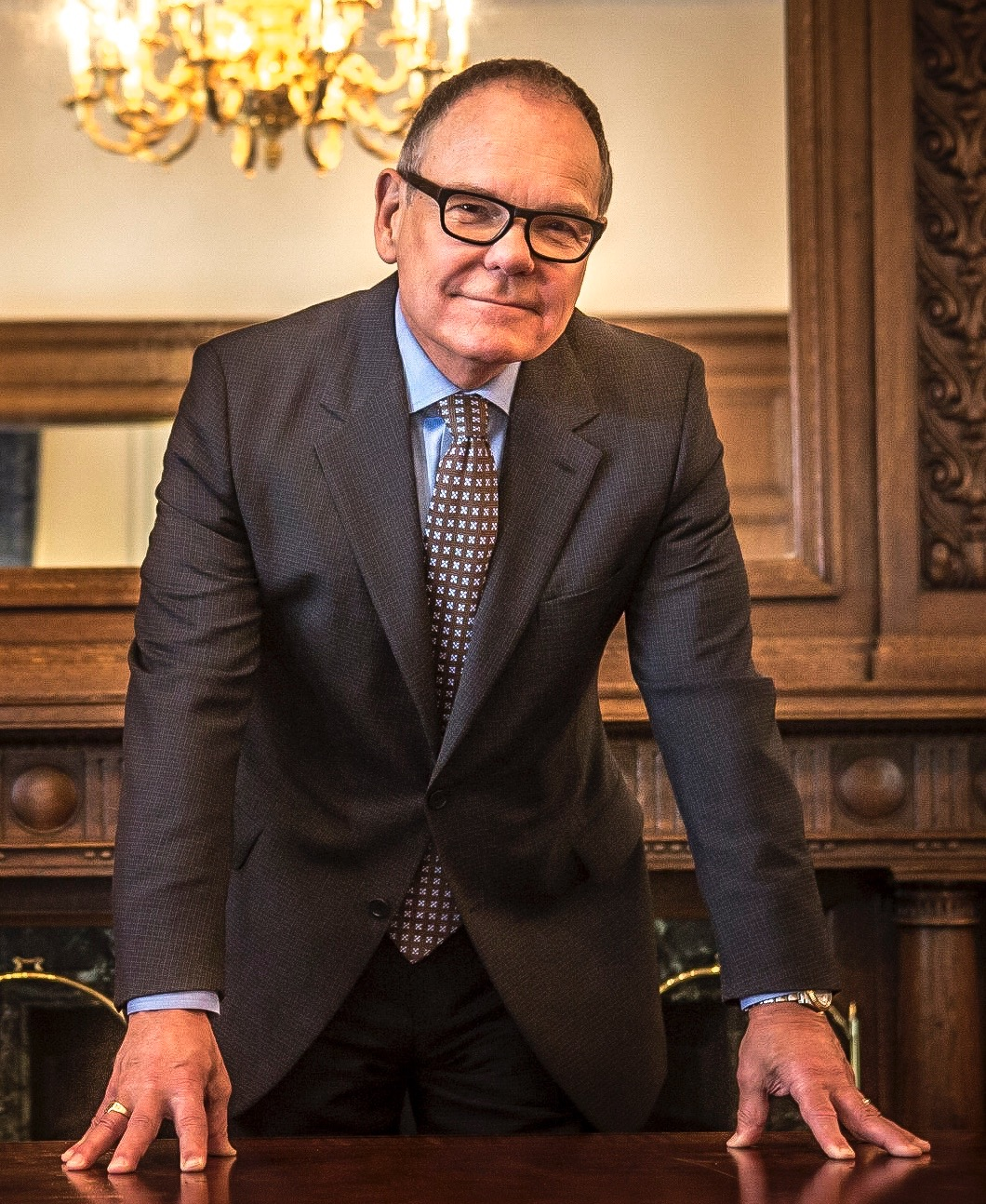
- Tapscott in 2014
- Born: June 1, 1947 (age 79); Toronto, Ontario, Canada
- Occupations: CEO, Tapscott Group; Chairman and co-Founder, Blockchain Research Institute
- Spouse: Ana Paula Lopes
- Children: Alex Tapscott, Nicole Tapscott
- Website: dontapscott.com

Don Tapscott CM (born June 1, 1947) is a Canadian business executive, author, consultant and public speaker.

== Career ==
Tapscott has authored or co-authored sixteen books, including Wikinomics: How Mass Collaboration Changes Everything (2006).

Tapscott lives in Toronto. He is the former Chancellor of his alma mater Trent University, and serves as an adjunct professor of Technology and Operations Management at INSEAD.

== Early life and education ==
Tapscott was born in Toronto and went to high school in Ontario, graduating from Park Street Collegiate Institute.

Tapscott holds a B.Sc. in psychology and statistics and an M.Ed. specializing in research methodology from the University of Alberta. As a student, he ran for mayor of Edmonton in the 1977 municipal election as a member of the Revolutionary Workers' League.

== Awards and recognition ==
Tapscott holds honorary degrees from the University of Alberta (2001), Trent University (2006), and McMaster University (2010).

He was named a Member of the Order of Canada in 2015.

== Bibliography ==
- Don Tapscott, Del Henderson, Morley Greenberg, Planning for Integrated Office Systems: A Strategic Approach, Carswell Legal Pubns, 1984. ISBN 0-87094-653-6.
- Don Tapscott, Del Henderson, Morley Greenberg, Office Automation: A User-Driven Method, Springer, 1985. ISBN 0-306-41973-4.
- Don Tapscott, Art Caston, Paradigm Shift: The New Promise of Information Technology, McGraw-Hill Companies, 1992. ISBN 0-07-062857-2.
- Don Tapscott, Ann Cavoukian, Who Knows: Safeguarding Your Privacy in a Networked World, McGraw-Hill, 1997. ISBN 0-07-063320-7.
- Don Tapscott, The Digital Economy: Promise and Peril In The Age of Networked Intelligence, McGraw-Hill, 1997. ISBN 0-07-063342-8.
- Don Tapscott, Growing Up Digital: The Rise of the Net Generation, McGraw-Hill, 1999. ISBN 978-0-07-134798-3.
- Don Tapscott, David Ticoll, Alex Lowy, Blueprint to the Digital Economy: Creating Wealth in the Era of E-Business, McGraw-Hill, 1999. ISBN 0-07-135213-9.
- Don Tapscott, Creating Value in the Network Economy, Harvard Business Press, 1999. ISBN 0-87584-911-3.
- Don Tapscott, David Ticoll, Alex Lowy, Digital Capital: Harnessing the Power of Business Webs, Harvard Business Press, 2000. ISBN 978-1-57851-193-8.
- Don Tapscott, David Ticoll, The Naked Corporation: How the Age of Transparency Will Revolutionize Business, Free Press, 2003. ISBN 0-7432-4650-0.
- Don Tapscott, Anthony D. Williams, Wikinomics: How Mass Collaboration Changes Everything, Portfolio Trade, 2006. ISBN 1-59184-367-7.
- Don Tapscott, Grown Up Digital: How the Net Generation is Changing Your World, McGraw-Hill, 2008. ISBN 0-07-150863-5.
- Don Tapscott, The Net Generation Takes The Lead; in: Willms Buhse/Ulrike Reinhard: Wenn Anzugträger auf Kapuzenpullis treffen (When Suits meet Hoodies), whois-Verlag 2009. ISBN 978-3-934013-98-8.
- Don Tapscott, Anthony D. Williams, Macrowikinomics: Rebooting Business and the World, Portfolio Hardcover, 2010. ISBN 978-1-59184-356-6.
- Don Tapscott, The Digital Economy Anniversary Edition: Rethinking Promise and Peril In the Age of Networked Intelligence, McGraw-Hill, 2014. ISBN 0-07-183555-5.
- Don Tapscott, Alex Tapscott, The Blockchain Revolution: How the Technology Behind Bitcoin is Changing Money, Business, and the World, Penguin Books, Released May 2016 ISBN 978-0670069972

Academic offices
Preceded by Tom Jackson	Chancellor of Trent University; 2013–2019	Succeeded by Stephen Stohn
