= Open business =

Business approach that draws on ideas from openness movements

Open business is an approach to enterprise that draws on ideas from openness movements like free software, open source, open content and open tools and standards. The approach places value on transparency, stakeholder inclusion, and accountability.

Open business structures make contributors and non-contributors visible so that business benefits are distributed accordingly. They seek to increase personal engagement and positive outcomes by rewarding contributors in an open way.

== Main ideas ==
Central to the concept are:

- Open learning/sharing — a fundamental tenet is open collaboration at all levels in all locations
- Open participation — open invitation to join the organization (similar to SourceForge, Blender community, where individual/team input within the community framework [for special services, consulting, training, adaptions, courses, camps, symposiums, books] can help to build individual income)
- Individual rights — each person is supported and encouraged to identify and optimise their personal development, i.e. technical, personal, spiritual, etc.
- Community focus — productivity activities are seen as part of a range of normal human activities e.g. family life, community life, religious commitments, etc.
- Institution free — the organization is not based on any existing institution - state, religious or otherwise. Members can hold whatever views or affiliations they like.
- Open knowledge — the free exchange of knowledge by making use -as much as possible- of open standards, open-source and open content principles.
- Open member details — including open access to the contact details of all other members in a convenient form (i.e. once the range and depth of those details have been approved for release by that particular member)
- Open financials — all accounting information including the compensation of others

== Details ==
=== Knowledge ===
- All knowledge and information is free and open between members (but also to the public at large via membership)
- Knowledge and information gets converted continuously from any location into a ubiquitously accessible form (via Internet Browser), converted from
  - physical documents,
  - individually held electronic documents,
  - closed databases, etc.
- Knowledge is built and cared for by the participants of the Open Business
- Knowledge becomes available in statu nascendi, i.e. just when created, not as a secondary reprocessing afterthought (Co-Creating in public a book on Wikinomics )

=== Financials ===
- Individual pay/income is based on individual social and professional competence, hours worked, performance
- Net profit is split between members, depending on their transparent individual contributions

Business means the state of being busy. The concept of business includes all the activities of earning money.

=== Management ===
- Management is just another (moderating and facilitating) role to optimize group processes (as primus inter pares, taking into account the varying individual skills and competencies)
- Decisions rise from a continuous Open Process by consensus building and voting, available to all involved members
- Management roles in projects are rotating (they come from the initiative of appropriate persons, who are selected and approved by the project members)

== Focused on transparent goods ==
Businesses that sell consumer products can operate in open ways, for example by disclosing prices for components and publishing operating information. There is an interest in the benefit of most stakeholders, whether shareholders, workers, families etc.

The risk of bankruptcy of such open-movement businesses is reduced because the fruits of their work remain in the commons and therefore remain as a permanent base for recovering the open business, even in their most critical situations.

== Focused on transparent services ==
A service orientated business can also operate in open ways. A business that documents all transactions (donations and use of donated money) real-time on their websites in public, is very open. Another example might be Canonical Ltd.

Open businesses can be more attractive to donors, especially if the name of the donors in social networks (as real names, Twitter-, Facebook- or other branded Online Ids) are made public too. So in this case even the donors participate in the charity as business and beyond by increasing their positive community karma (earning "whuffies") and building their reputation.

The risk of bankruptcy of such transaction-oriented businesses is reduced due to the fact, that

- they earn an increased trust by disclosing the cash flow to the public
- get more support by "vested" visible supporters

== Members ==
The degree of freedom to participate may vary:

- Any person may be a member, regardless of their races, sex, religion or political persuasion
  - either with the approval of the majority of members or
  - simply by an online registration process (with certifying Identity to avoid Identity theft, like PayPal does it, or Twitter does it now in a beta project)
- the degree of participation depends on social and professional competence and on self-regulating transparent business rules, constantly developed and cared for by the whole business community.
- the members may determine more or less their working time and location
  - from a rigid: 8-18 Monday to Friday as the expected working availability time
  - to a self-determined, synchronized or more a-synchronic schedule as need be (to give more space to individual preferences [creativity, qualification, family, community life, political engagement, etc.]).

== See also ==
- Corporate transparency
- E-democracy
- Open source governance
- Business models for open source software
- Open-source hardware
