= Ana Paula (footballer) =

Brazilian footballer (born 1997)

Personal information
- Full name: Ana Paula Pereira da Silva Villela
- Date of birth: 16 February 1997 (age 29)
- Place of birth: Rio de Janeiro, Brazil
- Height: 1.60 m (5 ft 3 in)
- Position: Forward

Senior career*
Years	Team	Apps	(Gls)
2016	Vasco da Gama	1	(0)
2017–2018	Ponte Preta	21	(0)
2019	Minas ICESP	3	(0)
2020	Vasco da Gama	0	(0)
2022–2023	1207 Antalya Spor	14	(1)
- * Club domestic league appearances and goals as of 29 January 2023

Ana Paula Pereira da Silva Villela (born 16 February 1997), known as Ana Paula, is a Brazilian footballer who plays as a forward, for 1207 Antalya Spor in the Turkish Women's Football Super League with jersey number 9.

== Personal life ==
Ana Paula was born in Rio de Janeiro.

== Career ==
Ana Paula played for Vasco da Gama in 2016. The next two years, she was with Ponte Preta in the Campeonato Brasileiro de Futebol Feminino Série A1. In 2019, she moved to Minas ICESP. She returned to Vasco in 2020.

In mid-October 2022, she moved to Turkey, and signed with 1207 Antalya Spor to play in the 2022–23 Women's Super League. She played only in the first half of the season, appearing in 14 matches and scoring one goal. On 1 September 2023, she left Turkey for Croatia.
