= Marketocracy =

- Industry: Finance research company
- Founded: 1 January 2000
- Headquarters: San Mateo, California
- Key people: Ken Kam, Mark Taguchi
- Products: Investment
- Services: Track, analyze and evaluate investors' trading activity
- Website: marketocracy.com

Marketocracy Capital Management, is the investment advisor for the Marketocracy family of mutual funds and uses the research generated by Marketocracy Data Services. Marketocracy has recruited over 70,000 people to manage over 100,000 model portfolios at marketocracy.com that compete to become the best investors.

Marketocracy was mentioned in the book Wikinomics: How Mass Collaboration Changes Everything (ISBN 1591841933) The book explores how some companies in the early 21st century have used mass collaboration (also called peer production) and open-source technology such as wikis to be successful.

With the passing of CEO and Founder Ken Kam in 2019, the future of the firm was left in limbo. In 2020, 11 Marketocracy Masters came together to acquire the company name and data to continue Ken's vision. They expect to re-launch as Marketocracy Masters in 2022.

== Marketocracy Data Services ==
Marketocracy Data Services is a research company whose mission is to find the best investors in the world and then track, analyze, and evaluate their trading activity. Virtual fund performance is tracked in real-time and follow all SEC rules mutual fund managers must adhere to. The best performing virtual funds based on long-term performance are used as the basis for the Marketocracy Masters 100 fund (ticker symbol: MOFQX) Marketocracy has signed research contracts with about 500 users. These users make up the talent pool from which the m100 team is comprised.

== Marketocracy Master100 fund (MOFQX) ==
As of November 30, 2014, the fund maintains a one-star Morningstar rating As of this same date, the fund has about $6.98 million in assets under management. The fund has underperformed the S&P 500 by substantial amounts in 5 of the last 6 years.

Year	S&P 500 TR	MOFQX	+/- S&P 500
2008	−37.00%	−45.59%	−8.59%
2009	+26.46%	+27.57%	+1.10%
2010	+15.06%	+10.54%	−4.52%
2011	+2.11%	−6.88%	−8.99%
2012	+16.00%	+2.71%	−13.29%
2013	+32.39%	+22.32%	−10.06%
2014 (to Q3)	+8.35%	−9.78%	−18.13%

Turnover increased each year from 116% in 2008 to 765% in 2012, and the fund has an expense ratio of 1.95%.

Yearly performance, turnover ratio, and expense ratio data available on Morningstar site: http://performance.morningstar.com/fund/performance-return.action?t=MOFQX&region=USA&culture=en-us

== mFOLIOS ==
mFOLIOs are professionally managed portfolios that give the public access to the best at Marketocracy through a managed account at FOLIOfn. As of July, 2009, the company has placed eleven Marketocracy members under contract to be mFOLIO Masters so the public can use their model portfolios to create mFOLIOs.
