= Anthony D. Williams (author) =

- Born: 1974 (age 51–52); Canada
- Education: London School of Economics (MA, PhD)
- Occupations: consultant, researcher, author
- Known for: The DEEP Centre, New Paradigm
- Notable work: Wikinomics, Macrowikinomics
- Website: deepcentre.com

Anthony D. Williams (born 1974) is a Canadian business consultant and author.

Williams has co-authored Wikinomics: How Mass Collaboration Changes Everything (2006), and Macrowikinomics: New Solutions for a Connected Planet (2010).

In 2012, Williams is the president and co-founder of the Canadian think tank The Centre for Digital Entrepreneurship and Economic Performance (DEEP Centre).

He studied at the London School of Economics, graduating with a Master's degree in research in political science.
