= Ana Paula Lopes =

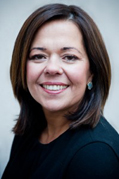

Ana Paula Lopes (born July 1959 in Lisbon, Portugal), is a Toronto-based social innovator, speaker and entrepreneur.

== Education and awards ==
Lopes holds a HonBA from the University of Toronto and has been the recipient of numerous awards including the Association of Fundraising Professionals (AFP) of Greater Toronto, Fundraising Volunteer of the Year in 2009 and was listed as one of WXN The 100 Most Powerful Women in Canada in December 2013. In 2014 the President of Portugal awarded Lopes the Portuguese Order of Merit. She was awarded the Queen Elizabeth II Diamond Jubilee Medal and was made a Member of the Order of Canada in 2011.

== Career ==
Lopes has worked for over 25 years in senior positions in the public sector, as Legislative Assistant to Ontario Minister of Culture Rosario Marchese starting in 1990 and starting in 1993 as Executive Assistant to Ontario's 21st Premier Bob Rae. She began her career in the 1980s in public policy for the Ontario Government in the Ministry of Citizenship and Culture and the Policy and Planning Departments of the Municipality of Metropolitan Toronto.

Lopes is a Director of the Tapscott Group – a privately held business strategy-consulting firm.

As a corporate director in the not-for-profit sector, Lopes has led numerous transformations. She is the immediate past chair of the Centre for Addiction and Mental Health Foundation (CAMHF) – Canada's largest mental health and addiction hospital. She is a Breakthrough Campaign Cabinet Member which is leading a $1 billion transformation of that institution. She is the former chair of the board of directors of the Toronto Symphony Orchestra, and a former director of many organizations, including Sunnybrook Health Sciences Centre Foundation, Women's College Hospital Foundation, Trent University, Business for the Arts and a leader and mentor in the Portuguese-Canadian community. She is a Member of the Writers' Trust of Canada board of directors.

== Personal life ==
Lopes and her husband Don Tapscott endowed the Tapscott Chair in Schizophrenia at the University of Toronto.

Lopes is married to Don Tapscott, author of numerous bestselling books such as The Digital Economy and Wikinomics. They have two married adult children.
