= Ana Paula Zacarias =

Portuguese diplomat

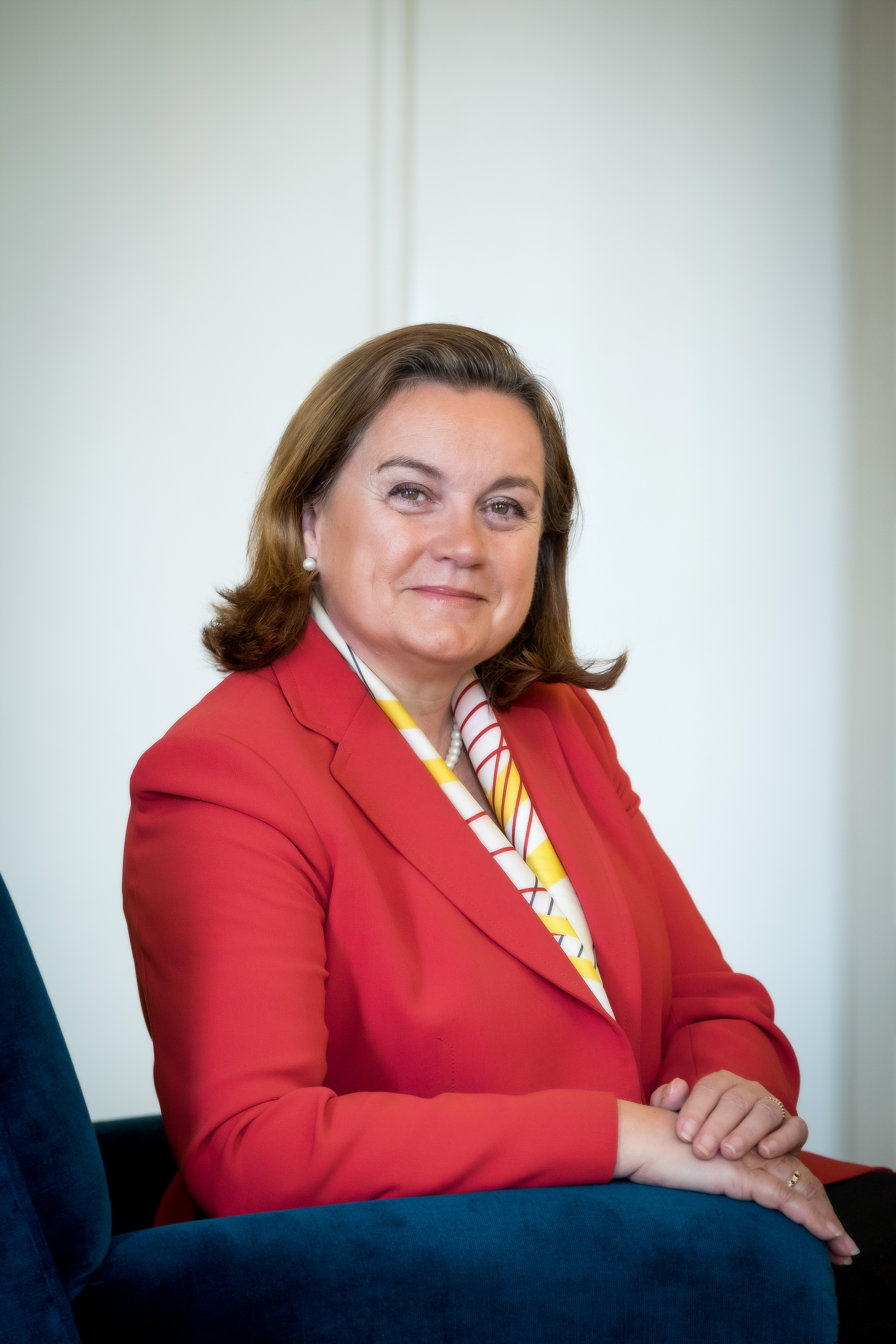

Secretary of State for European Affairs
- In office 14 July 2017 – 30 March 2022
- Prime Minister: António Costa
- Preceded by: Margarida Marques
- Succeeded by: Tiago Antunes

European Union Ambassador to Brazil
- In office 8 March 2011 – July 2015
- President: José Manuel Barroso, Herman van Rompuy
- Preceding: João Pacheco
- Succeeded by: João Gomes Cravinho

Deputy at the Permanent Representation of Portugal in the EU
- In office January 2009 – March 2011
- Succeeded by: Pedro Costa Pereira

Personal details
- Born: 5 January 1959 (age 67) Lisbon, Portugal
- Education: Universidade Nova de Lisboa
- Profession: Ambassador

Ana Paula Zacarias (born 5 January 1959 in Lisbon, Portugal) is a Portuguese diplomat and the Secretary of State for European Affairs of the XXII Constitutional Government of Portugal. She was Head of the European Union's delegation to Brazil from 2011 to 2015.

== Biography ==
Ana Paula completed her degree in Cultural Anthropology in 1983 at the New University of Lisbon (NOVA). From 1984 to 2011, she held various positions with the Portuguese Ministry of Foreign Affairs. During this time, she worked as Vice President of the Camões Institute in Lisbon (2000), Deputy Permanent Representative of Portugal to UNESCO in Paris (2005), and Ambassador of Portugal to Estonia in Tallinn (2008) before becoming Deputy Permanent Representative of Portugal to the European Union in Brussels until 2011.

On 8 March 2011, she was appointed as the European Union's Head of Delegation to Brazil. In July 2015, she was replaced by João Gomes Cravinho.

In July 2017, she was appointed Secretary of State for European Affairs in the XXI Constitutional Government of Portugal.
