= User-generated content =

Online content created by users

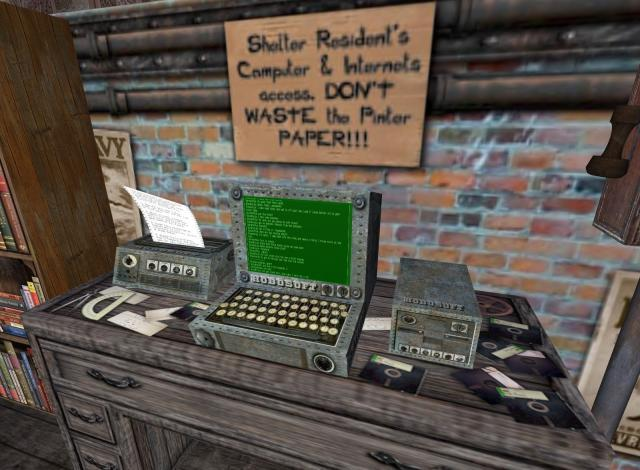
An example of user-generated content, a personalized sign and objects in the virtual world of Second Life

User-generated content (UGC), alternatively known as user-created content (UCC), is content generated by users of the Internet such as images, videos, audio, text, testimonials, and software.

== Definition ==
The Organization for Economic Co-operation and Development (OECD) has defined three core variables for UGC:

1. Accessible Content: User-generated content (UGC) is publicly produced through platforms located on the Internet and is available to any individual browsing such a publicly accessible website or a public social media account. There are other contexts where users must remain in a community or closed group to access and publish on such platforms (for example, wikis). This is a way of differentiating that although the content is accessible to the audience, there are certain restrictions for the users who generates the content.
2. Creative effort: Creative effort was put into creating the work or adapting existing works to construct a new one; i.e. users must add their own value to the work. UGC often also has a collaborative element to it, as is the case with websites that users can edit collaboratively. For example, merely copying a portion of a television show and posting it to an online video website (an activity frequently seen on the UGC sites) would not be considered UGC. However, uploading photographs, expressing one's thoughts in a blog post or creating a new music video could be considered UGC. Yet the minimum amount of creative effort is hard to define and depends on the context.
3. Creation outside professional routines and practices: User-generated content is generally created outside professional routines and practices. It often does not have an institutional or a commercial market context. In extreme cases, UGC may be produced by non-professionals without the expectation of profit or remuneration. Motivating factors include connecting with peers, achieving a certain level of fame, notoriety, or prestige, and the desire to express oneself. This helps build a community of like-minded individuals.

== Media pluralism ==
According to Cisco, in 2016 an average of 96,000 petabytes was transferred monthly over the Internet, more than twice as many as in 2012. In 2016, the number of active websites surpassed 1 billion, up from approximately 700 million in 2012.

Reaching 1.66 billion daily active users in Q4 2019, Facebook is the most popular social media platform globally. Other social media platforms are also dominant at the regional level such as: Twitter in Japan, Naver in the Republic of Korea, Instagram (owned by Facebook) and LinkedIn (owned by Microsoft) in Africa, VKontakte (VK) and Odnoklassniki (eng. Classmates) in Russia and other countries in Central and Eastern Europe, WeChat and QQ in China.

However, a concentration phenomenon is occurring globally giving dominance to a few online platforms that become popular for some unique features they provide, most commonly for the added privacy they offer users through disappearing messages or end-to-end encryption (e.g. Jami, Signal, Snapchat, Telegram, Viber, and WhatsApp), but they have tended to occupy niches and to facilitate the exchanges of information that remain rather invisible to larger audiences.

Production of freely accessible information has been increasing since 2012. In January 2017, Wikipedia had more than 43 million articles, almost twice as many as in January 2012. This corresponded to a progressive diversification of content and an increase in contributions in languages other than English. In 2017, less than 12 percent of Wikipedia content was in English, down from 18 percent in 2012. Graham, Straumann, and Hogan say that the increase in the availability and diversity of content has not radically changed the structures and processes for the production of knowledge. For example, while content on Africa has dramatically increased, a significant portion of this content has continued to be produced by contributors operating from North America and Europe, rather than from Africa itself.

== History ==
The Oxford English Dictionary was primarily composed of user-generated content. In 1857, Richard Chenevix Trench of the London Philological Society sought public contributions throughout the English-speaking world for the creation of the first edition of the OED.

In the 1990s several electronic bulletin board systems were based on user-generated content. Some of these systems have been converted into websites, including the film information site IMDb which started as rec.arts.movies in 1990. With the growth of the World Wide Web the focus moved to websites, several of which were based on user-generated content, including Wikipedia (2001) and Flickr (2004).

User-generated Internet video was popularized by YouTube, an online video platform founded by Chad Hurley, Jawed Karim and Steve Chen in April 2005. It enabled the video streaming of MPEG-4 AVC (H.264) user-generated content from anywhere on the World Wide Web.

The BBC set up a pilot user-generated content team in April 2005 with 3 staff. In the wake of the 7 July 2005 London bombings and the Buncefield oil depot fire, the team was made permanent and was expanded, reflecting the arrival in the mainstream of the citizen journalist. After the Buncefield disaster the BBC received over 5,000 photos from viewers. The BBC does not normally pay for content generated by its viewers.

In 2006, CNN launched CNN iReport, a project designed to bring user-generated news content to CNN. Its rival Fox News Channel launched its project to bring in user-generated news, similarly titled "uReport". This was typical of major television news organizations in 2005–2006, who realized, particularly in the wake of the London 7 July bombings, that citizen journalism could now become a significant part of broadcast news. Sky News, for example, regularly solicits photographs and videos from its viewers.

User-generated content was featured in Time magazine's 2006 Person of the Year, in which the person of the year was "you", referring to the user.

== Ranking and assessment ==
The distribution of UGC across the Web provides a high-volume data source that is accessible for analysis, and offers utility in enhancing the experiences of end users. Social science research can benefit from having access to the opinions of a population of users, and use this data to make inferences about their traits. Applications in information technology seek to mine end user data to support and improve machine-based processes, such as information retrieval and recommendation. However, processing the high volumes of data offered by UGC necessitate the ability to automatically sort and filter these data points according to their value.

Determining the value of user contributions for assessment and ranking can be difficult due to the variation in the quality and structure of this data. The quality and structure of the data provided by UGC is application-dependent, and can include items such as tags, reviews, or comments that may or may not be accompanied by useful metadata. Additionally, the value of this data depends on the specific task for which it will be utilized and the available features of the application domain. Value can ultimately be defined and assessed according to whether the application will provide service to a crowd of humans, a single end user, or a platform designer.

The variation of data and specificity of value has resulted in various approaches and methods for assessing and ranking UGC. The performance of each method essentially depends on the features and metrics that are available for analysis. Consequently, it is critical to have an understanding of the task objective and its relation to how the data is collected, structured, and represented in order to choose the most appropriate approach to utilizing it. The methods of assessment and ranking can be categorized into two classes: human-centered and machine-centered. Methods emphasizing human-centered utility consider the ranking and assessment problem in terms of the users and their interactions with the system, whereas the machine-centered method considers the problem in terms of machine learning and computation. The various methods of assessment and ranking can be classified into one of four approaches: community-based, user-based, designer-based, and hybrid.

- Community-based approaches rely on establishing ground truth based on the wisdom of the crowd regarding the content of interest. The assessments provided by the community of end users is utilized to directly rank content within the system in human-centered methods. The machine-centered method applies these community judgments in training algorithms to automatically assess and rank UGC.
- User-based approaches emphasize the differences between individual users so that ranking and assessment can interactively adapt or be personalized given the particular requirements of each user. The human-centered approach accentuates interactive interfaces where the user can define and redefine their preferences as their interests shift. On the other hand, machine-centered approaches model the individual user according to explicit and implicit knowledge that is gathered through system interactions.
- Designer-based approaches primarily use machine-centered methods to essentially maximize the diversity of content presented to users to avoid constraining the space of topic selections or perspectives. The diversity of content can be assessed with respect to various dimensions, such as authorship, topics, sentiments, and named entities.
- Hybrid approaches seek to combine methods from the various frameworks to develop a more robust approach for assessing and ranking UGC. Approaches are most often combined in one of two ways: the crowd-based approach is often used to identify hyperlocal content for a user-based approach, or a user-based approach is used to maintain the intent of a designer-based approach.

== Types ==
There are a number of types of user-generated content: Internet forums, where people talk about different topics; blogs are services where users can post about multiple topics, product reviews on a supplier website or in social media; wikis such as Wikipedia and Fandom allow users, sometimes including anonymous users, to edit the content. Another type of user-generated content are social networking sites like Facebook, Instagram, Tumblr, Twitter, Snapchat, Twitch, TikTok, or VK, where users interact with other people via chatting, writing messages, posting images or links, and sharing content. Media hosting sites such as YouTube and Vimeo allow users to post content. Some forms of user-generated content, such as a social commentary blog, can be considered as a form of citizen journalism.

=== Blogs ===
Blogs are websites created by individuals, groups, and associations. They mostly consist of journal-style text and enable interaction between a blogger and reader in the form of online comments. Self-hosted blogs can be created by professional entities such as entrepreneurs and small businesses. Blog hosting platforms include WordPress, Blogger, and Medium; Typepad is often used by media companies; Weebly is geared for online shopping. Social networking blogging platforms include Tumblr, LiveJournal, and Weibo. Among the multiple blogs on the web, Boing Boing is a group blog with themes including technology and science fiction; HuffPost blogs include opinions on subjects such as politics, entertainment, and technology. There are also travel blogs such as Head for Points, Adventurous Kate, and an early form of The Points Guy.

=== Websites ===
Entertainment social media and information sharing websites include Reddit, 9gag, 4chan, Upworthy and Newgrounds. Sites like 9Gag allow users to create memes and quick video clips. Sites like Tech in Asia and BuzzFeed engage readers with professional communities by posting articles with user-generated comment sections. Other websites include fanfiction sites such as FanFiction.Net; imageboards; artwork communities like DeviantArt; mobile photos and video sharing sites such as Picasa and Flickr; audio social networks such as SoundCloud; crowd funding or crowdsourcing sites like Kickstarter, Indiegogo, and ArtistShare; and customer review sites such as Yelp.

After launching in the mid-2000s, major UGC-based adult websites like Pornhub, YouPorn and xHamster became the dominant mode of consumption and distribution of pornographic content on the internet. The appearance of pornographic content on sites like Wikipedia and Tumblr led moderators and site owners to institute stricter limits on uploads.

The restaurant industry has also been altered by a review system that places more emphasis on online reviews and content from peers than traditional media reviews. In 2011 Yelp contained 70% of reviews for restaurants in the Seattle area compared to Food & Wine Magazine containing less than 5 percent.

=== Video games ===
Video games can have fan-made content in the form of mods, fan patches, fan translations or server emulators. Some games come with level editor programs to aid in their creation. A few massively multiplayer online games including Star Trek Online, Dota 2, and EverQuest 2 have UGC systems integrated into the game itself. A metaverse can be a user-generated world, such as Second Life. Second Life is a 3-D virtual world which provides its users with tools to modify the game world and participate in an economy, trading user content created via online creation for virtual currency. Game platforms like Fortnite and Roblox offer means for users to create their own games such as premade assets, tools to generate new assets, and scripting capabilities. These new creations can then be shared to other users via the platforms' content listings.

=== Retailers ===
Some bargain hunting websites feature user-generated content, such as eBay, Dealsplus, and FatWallet which allow users to post, discuss, and control which bargains get promoted within the community. Because of the dependency on social interaction, these sites fall into the category of social commerce.

=== Educational ===
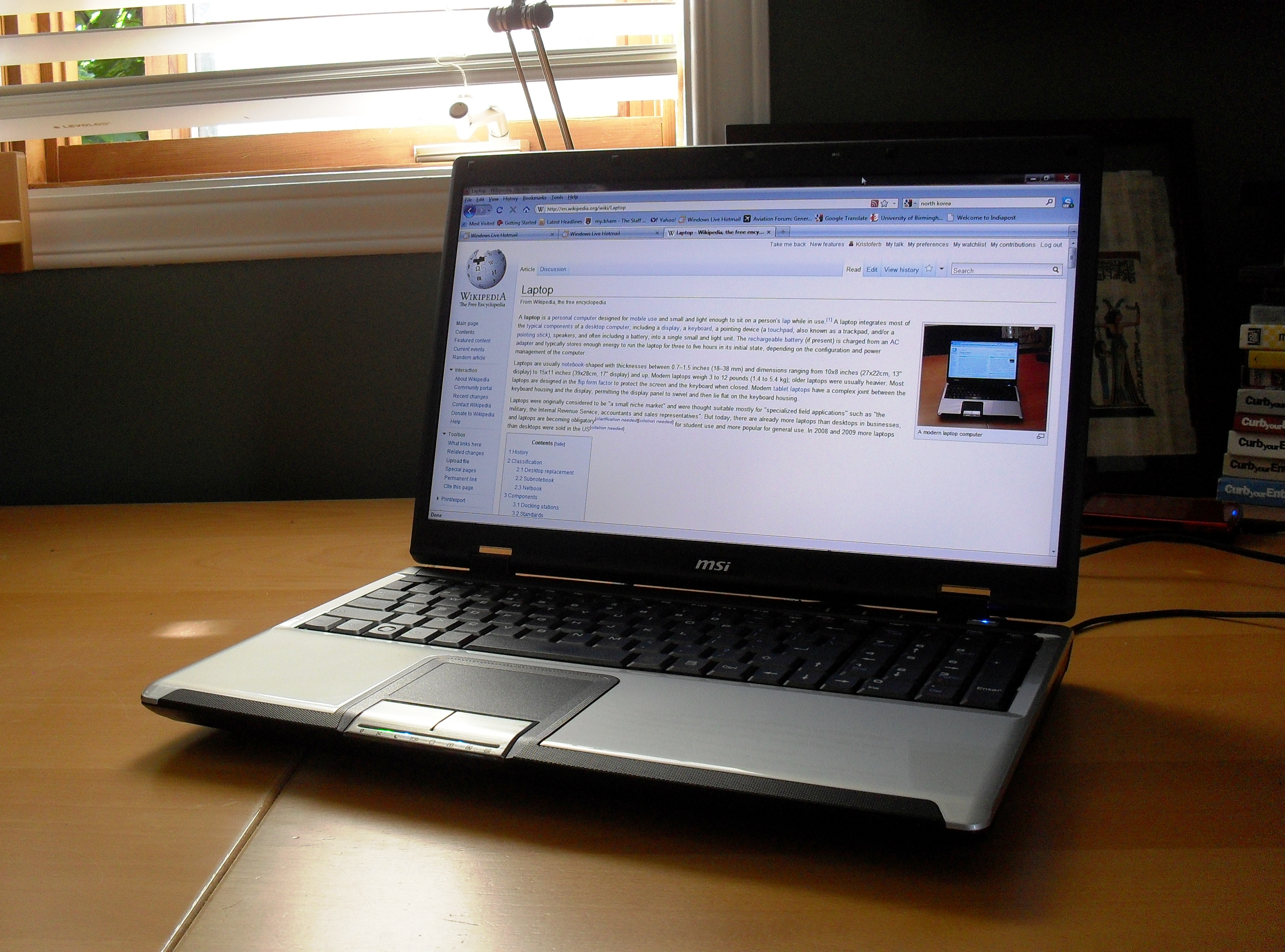
The content of Wikipedia is written and generated by its users; therefore it can be called user-generated content.

Wikipedia, a free encyclopedia, is one of the largest user-generated content databases in the world. Platforms such as YouTube have frequently been used as an instructional aid. Organizations such as the Khan Academy and the Green brothers have used the platform to upload series of videos on topics such as math, science, and history to help aid viewers master or better understand the basics. Educational podcasts have also helped in teaching through an audio platform. Personal websites and messaging systems like Yahoo Messenger have also been used to transmit user-generated educational content. There have also been web forums where users advise each other.

Students can also manipulate digital images or video clips to their advantage and tag them with easy-to-find keywords then share them with friends and family worldwide. The category of "student performance content" has risen in the form of discussion boards and chat logs. Students could write reflective journals and diaries that may help others. The websites SparkNotes and Shmoop are used to summarize and analyze books so that they are more accessible to the reader.

=== Photo sharing ===
Photo sharing websites are another popular form of UGC. Flickr is a site in which users can upload personal photos they have taken and label them in regards to their "motivation". Flickr not only hosts images but makes them publicly available for reuse and reuse with modification. Instagram is a social media platform that allows users to edit, upload and include location information with photos they post. Panoramio.com and Flickr use metadata, such as GPS coordinates that allows for geographic placement of images.

=== Video sharing ===
Video sharing websites are another popular form of UGC. YouTube and TikTok allow users to create and upload videos.

A popular form of User-Generated Video Content is shared in the form of video blogs, or vlogs. Vlogs are a form of content that individuals create to capture their unique experiences. Creators of this type of content create a unique relationship with the viewer that is intimate and personal. The type of vlogs created vary in subject matter. These subjects are related but not limited to lifestyle, travel, or entertainment. Vlogging became popularized in the early years of the 2000s. As opposed to traditional blogs, which traditionally only contain words, vlogs give creators the ability to communicate with their audience through body language, moving images, and audio.

== Effect on journalism ==
The incorporation of user-generated content into mainstream journalism outlets is considered to have begun in 2005 with the BBC's creation of a user-generated content team, which was expanded and made permanent in the wake of the 7 July 2005 London bombings. The incorporation of Web 2.0 technologies into news websites allowed user-generated content online to move from more social platforms such as MySpace, LiveJournal, and personal blogs, into the mainstream of online journalism, in the form of comments on news articles written by professional journalists, but also through surveys, content sharing, and other forms of citizen journalism.

Since the mid-2000s, journalists and publishers have had to consider the effects that user-generated content has had on how news gets published, read, and shared. A 2016 study on publisher business models suggests that readers of online news sources value articles written both by professional journalists, as well as users—provided that those users are experts in a field relevant to the content that they create. In response to this, it is suggested that online news sites must consider themselves not only a source for articles and other types of journalism but also a platform for engagement and feedback from their communities. The ongoing engagement with a news site that is possible due to the interactive nature of user-generated content is considered a source of sustainable revenue for publishers of online journalism going forward.

Journalists are increasingly sourcing UGC from platforms, such as Facebook and TikTok, as news shifts to a digital space. This form of crowdsourcing can include using user content to support claims, using social media platforms to contact witnesses and obtain relevant images and videos for articles.

== Use in marketing ==
Companies can leverage user-generated content (UGC) to improve their products and services through feedback obtained by users. Additionally, UGC can improve decision-making processes by strengthening potential consumers and guiding them toward purchasing and consumption decisions. An increasing number of companies have been employing UGC techniques into their marketing efforts, such as Starbucks with their "White Cup Contest" campaign where customers competed to create the best doodle on their cups.

The effectiveness of UGC in marketing has been shown to be significant as well. For instance, the "Share a Coke" by Coca-Cola campaign in which customers uploaded images of themselves with bottles to social media attributed to a two percent increase in revenue. Of millennials, UGC can influence purchase decisions up to fifty-nine percent of the time, and eighty-four percent say that UGC on company websites has at least some influence on what they buy, typically in a positive way. As a whole, consumers place peer recommendations and reviews above those of professionals.

User-generated content can enhance marketing strategies by gathering relevant information from users and directing social media advertising efforts toward UGC marketing, which functions similarly to influencer marketing. However, each serves different purposes and plays distinct roles. The distinction between UGC creators and influencers lies primarily in their approaches to content creation. UGC creators are a varied range of individuals who share content based on their personal experiences with a product, service, or brand. They typically do not collaborate with specific brands, which lends authenticity to their posts and makes them relatable to their audience. In contrast, influencers have a significant and engaged following. They create branded content through sponsorships and paid partnerships with companies. Their role is to influence their followers' purchasing decisions, and their content is usually more polished and aligns closely with the branding and messaging of the companies they work with.

User-generated content that is driven by one’s own individual incentive are rare, but equally as valuable to a brand’s reputation on social media. This classification of User-Generated Content grant the brand with advertisement without the loss of expenses. Consumers who create user-generated content without an external reward can be referred to as "unofficial brand ambassadors". These creators are not contractually bonded to a company. Without the contractual requirement involved when producing a video, personally driven User-Generated Content creators are free to construct their own narrative for the product, brand, or service that is the topic of discussion. Organic user-generated content that positively reflects the brand or their product can lead to positive outcomes for the company. Alternatively, personally driven User-Generated content that is negative can lead to negative consequences. Brands that have experienced negative User-Generated content have seen negative impacts, such as dropped stock prices. Due to the uncontrollable nature of personally driven user-generated content, some companies are uncertain about the value of motivating their consumers to create user-generated content. A few of the risks associated with this type of user-generated content are creators expressing false information about the product, dishonest advantages of the product, or misleading representation of the brand or company.

== Criticism ==
The term "user-generated content" has received some criticism. The criticism to date has addressed issues of fairness, quality, privacy, the sustainable availability of creative work and effort among legal issues namely related to intellectual property rights such as copyrights etc.

Some commentators assert that the term "user" implies an illusory or unproductive distinction between different kinds of "publishers", with the term "users" exclusively used to characterize publishers who operate on a much smaller scale than traditional mass-media outlets or who operate for free.

Another criticized aspect is the vast array of user-generated product and service reviews that can at times be misleading for consumers on the web. A study conducted at Cornell University found that an estimated 1 to 6 percent of positive user-generated online hotel reviews are fake.

Another concern of platforms that rely heavily on user-generated content, such as Twitter and Facebook, is how easy it is to find people who holds the same opinions and interests in addition to how well they facilitate the creation of networks or closed groups. While the strength of these services are that users can broaden their horizon by sharing their knowledge and connect with other people from around the world, these platforms also make it very easy to connect with only a restricted sample of people who holds similar opinions (see Filter bubble).

There is also criticism regarding whether or not those who contribute to a platform should be paid for their content. In 2015, a group of 18 famous content creators on Vine attempted to negotiate a deal with Vine representatives to secure a $1.2 million contract for a guaranteed 12 videos a month. This negotiation was not successful.

== Legal issues ==
The ability for services to accept user-generated content opens up a number of legal concerns, from the broader sense to specific local laws. In general, knowing who committed the online crime is difficult because many use pseudonyms or remain anonymous. Sometimes it can be traced back. But in the case of a public coffee shop, they have no way of pinpointing the exact user. There is also a problem with the issues surrounding extremely harmful but not legal acts. For example, the posting of content that instigates a person's suicide. It is a criminal offense if there is proof of "beyond reasonable doubt" but different situations may produce different outcomes. Depending on the country, there is certain laws that come with Web 2.0. In the United States, the "Section 230" exemptions of the Communications Decency Act state that "no provider or user of an interactive computer service shall be treated as the publisher or speaker of any information provided by another information content provider." This clause effectively provides a general immunity for websites that host user-generated content that is defamatory, deceptive or otherwise harmful, even if the operator knows that the third-party content is harmful and refuses to take it down. An exception to this general rule may exist if a website promises to take down the content and then fails to do so.

=== Copyright laws ===
Copyright laws also play a factor in relation to user-generated content, as users may use such services to upload works—particularly videos—that they do not have the sufficient rights to distribute. In multiple cases, the use of these materials may be covered by local "fair use" laws, especially if the use of the material submitted is transformative. Local laws also vary on who is liable for any resulting copyright infringements caused by user-generated content; in the United States, the Online Copyright Infringement Liability Limitation Act (OCILLA)—a portion of the Digital Millennium Copyright Act (DMCA), dictates safe harbor provisions for "online service providers" as defined under the act, which grants immunity from secondary liability for the copyright-infringing actions of their users, as long as they promptly remove access to allegedly infringing materials upon the receipt of a notice from a copyright holder or registered agent, and they do not have actual knowledge that their service is being used for infringing activities.

In the UK, the Defamation Act of 1996 says that if a person is not the author, editor or publisher and did not know about the situation, they are not convicted. Furthermore, ISPs are not considered authors, editors, or publishers and they cannot have responsibility for people they have no "effective control" over. Just like the DMCA, once the ISP learns about the content, they must delete it immediately. The European Union's approach is horizontal by nature, which means that civil and criminal liability issues are addressed under the Electronic Commerce Directive. Section 4 deals with liability of the ISP while conducting "mere conduit" services, caching and web hosting services.

== Research ==
A study on YouTube analyzing one of the video-on-demand systems was conducted in 2007. The length of the video had decreased twofold from the non-UGC content but they saw a fast production rate. The user behavior is what perpetuates the UGC. The act of P2P (peer-to-peer) was studied and saw a great benefit to the system. They also studied the impact of content aliasing, sharing of multiple copies, and illegal uploads.

A study from York University in Ontario in 2012 conducted research that resulted in a proposed framework for comparing brand-related UGC and to understand how the strategy used by a company could influence the brand sentiment across different social media channels including YouTube, Twitter and Facebook. The three scholars of this study examined two clothing brands, Lulu Lemon and American Apparel. The difference between these two brands is that Lulu Lemon had a social media following while American Apparel was the complete opposite with no social media following. Unsurprisingly, Lulu Lemon had much more positive contributions compared to American Apparel which had fewer positive contributions. Lulu Lemon has three times the number of positive contributions, 64 percent vs 22 percent for American Apparel on Twitter while on Facebook and YouTube, they had roughly an equal number of contributions. This proves that social media can influence how a brand is perceived, usually in a more positive light. A study by Dhar and Chang, published in 2007, found that the volume of blogs posted on a music album was positively correlated with future sales of that album.

== See also ==
- Carr–Benkler wager
- Cognitive Surplus – Book by Clay Shirky
- Collective intelligence – Group intelligence that emerges from collective efforts
- Communal marketing – Type of advertising
- Consumer generated marketing – Type of advertising
- Content creation – Contribution of information to any media
- Content moderation – System to sort undesirable contributions
- Creative Commons – Organization designing open copyright licenses
- Crowdsourcing – Sourcing services or funds from a group
- Customer engagement – Type of interaction
- Digital public square
- Fan art – Artwork featuring aspects of a work of fiction created by a fan
- Fan fiction – Type of fiction created by fans of the original subject
- List of online image archives
- Modding – Customization of a product by the end user
- Networked information economy – 2006 book by Yochai Benkler
- Participatory culture – Cultural production made through social interactions of different communities and groups
- Participatory design – Active involvement of all stakeholders in the design process
- Prosumer – Person who consumes and produces a product
- User-centered design – Framework of processes with focus on users, uses, and tasks
- User-generated TV
- User innovation – Revolutional resource
- Web 2.0 – Websites that use technology beyond the static pages of the early Internet

== Sources ==
- This article incorporates text from a free content work. Licensed under CC BY SA 3.0 IGO (license statement/permission). Text taken from World Trends in Freedom of Expression and Media Development Global Report 2017/2018, 202, University of Oxford, UNESCO.
