= Industrial information economy =

Industrial information economy is a term coined by Harvard University Professor Yochai Benkler. Benkler discusses this term in-depth in his 2006 book The Wealth of Networks: How Social Production Transforms Markets and Freedom.

Industrial information economy is the first form of information economy and has existed since the late-nineteenth century and into the twentieth-century (Benkler 2006, p. 3). Recently, industrial information economy evolved into a new form known as networked information economy with the advent of the Internet (Benkler 2003, pp. 1250–1251).

It represents one in which consumers are passive, as opposed to the networked information economy in which consumers are active often to the point of equally being producers (either in terms of creativity or by allowing usage of their idle processing, storage or bandwidth). In addition, industrial information economy promoted the dominance of the mega-corporation, and created passive workers who had no control over what they produced or consumed.

Benkler contends that within the industrial information economy "most opportunities to make things that were valuable and important to many people were constrained by the physical capital requirements of making them" (Benkler 2006, p. 6) and thus in comparison to the networked information economy undemocratic. Based on information technology, according to Paliwala, the industrial information economy was centred on information and cultural production, and the manipulation of symbols whereas the networked information economy is based on communications.

Benkler points out (Benkler 2006, p. 2) that the incumbents of the industrial information economy are threatened by the networked information economy. In response to this threat he references examples of the incumbents fighting back; including the broadcast flag and the Digital Millennium Copyright Act. Other well known examples could have equally have been added such as telephone operator blocking of Skype (Blue Coat n.d.), the HDCP standard as well as other forms of digital rights management such as those found in Microsoft Vista (Gutmann n.d.).

Benkler warns that how the battle between the incumbents of the industrial information economy against the emerging networked information economy plays out, the life of individuals in the world's most advanced economies will be deeply affected. He states (Benkler 2006, p. 2):

How these battles turn out over the next decade or so will likely have a significant effect on how we come to know what is going on in the world we occupy, and to what extent and in what forms we will be able—as autonomous individuals, as citizens, and as participants in cultures and communities—to affect how we and others see the world as it is and as it might be.

In his introduction to Wealth of Networks, Benkler suggests that the industrial information economy will make our culture more transparent and malleable. This will happen because easy and quick access to information will let us learn in real time about our present culture. His ideas are drawn from and supported by legal scholars Niva Elkin Koren, Terry Fisher, Larry Lessig, and Jack Balkin who have talked about how the Internet democratizes culture. (Benkler, 2006 p. 15)

I suggest that the networked information environment offers us a more attractive cultural production system in two distinct ways: (1) it makes culture more transparent, and (2) it makes culture more malleable. Together, these mean that we are seeing the emergence of a new folk culture—a practice that has been largely suppressed in the industrial era of cultural production—where many more of us participate actively in making cultural moves and finding meaning in the world around us. These practices make their practitioners better "readers" of their own culture and more self-reflective and critical of the culture they occupy, thereby enabling them to become more self-reflective participants in conversations within that culture. (Benkler, 2006 p. 15)

== Historical Origins of Industrial Information Economy ==
The industrial information economy (a.k.a. information economy) traces back to the Industrial Revolution and to the resulting crisis of control. Advanced industrial nations began to recognize how usable information could be a means of controlling their respective economies. During the 1880s and 1890s, the notion of efficiently producing and using information was key to controlling physical processes and human behaviour (Benkler 2003, p. 1251).

== See also ==
- Networked information economy
- Commons-based peer production
- Network neutrality
