= Mass amateurization =

Social and economic phenomenon

Mass amateurization is a social and economic phenomenon in which new media technologies have enabled non-professionals to perform tasks and services traditionally associated with larger, professional institutions. These capabilities can allow amateurs to compete with established organizations. Web 2.0 is commonly associated with the phenomenon of mass amateurization, with the rise of blogs and citizen journalism, photo and video-sharing services, user-generated wikis, and distributed accommodation services enabling the work of non-professionals.

Contrary to a traditional model of institution, mass amateurization lacks a foundational hierarchy. Alternatively, the phenomenon is based upon an informal group of collaborators working together to accomplish a general goal or solution to a problem. As a result of mass amateurization, amateurs are able to collaborate without the interference from the inherent obstacles associated with institutions. These obstacles include the costs that an institution incurs while educating, training, directing, coaching, advising, and organizing its members.

== Background ==
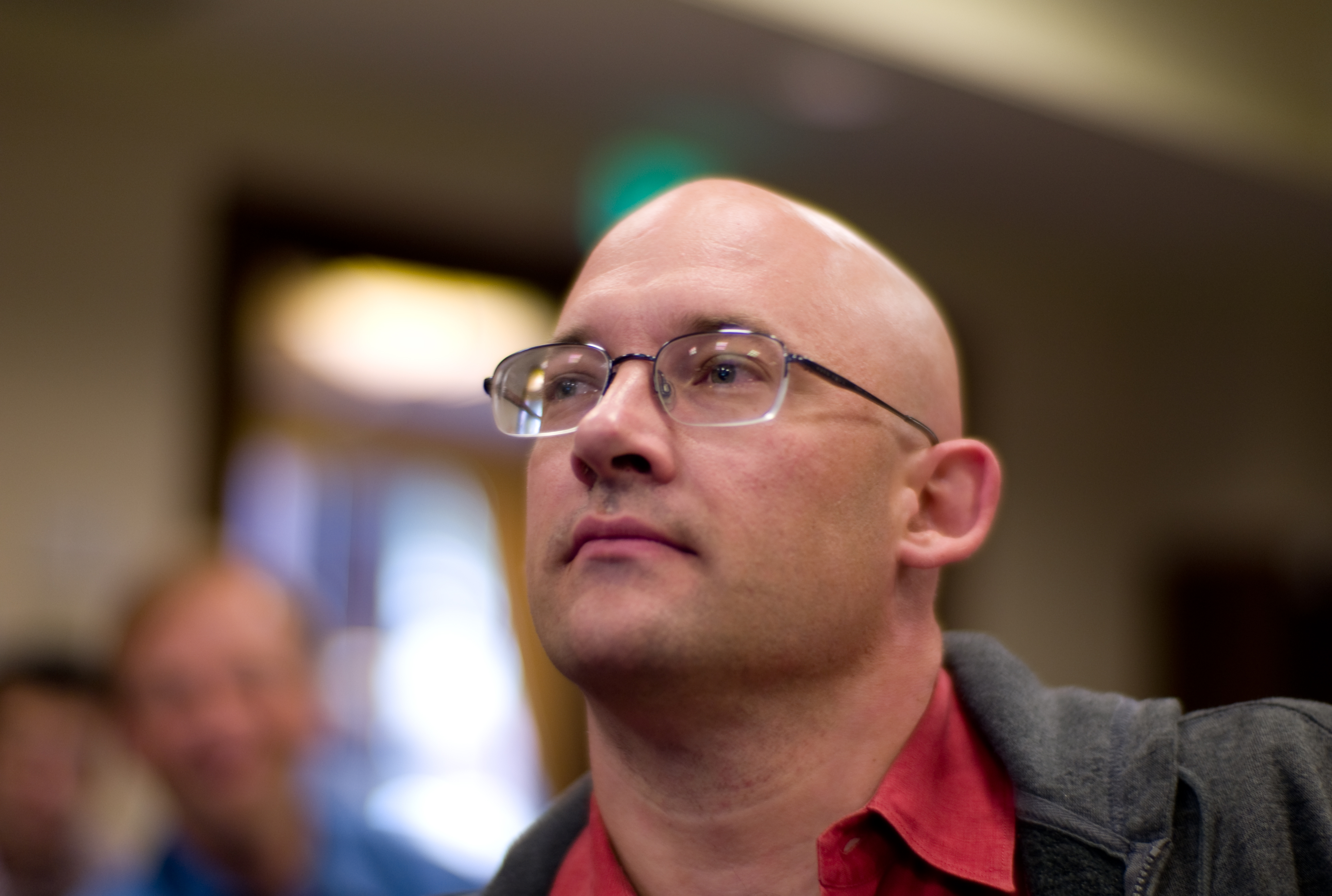
Clay Shirky

Mass amateurization was first popularized by Clay Shirky in his 2008 book, Here Comes Everybody: The Power of Organizing without Organizations. Shirky notes that blogging, video-sharing and photo-sharing websites allow anyone to publish an article or photo without the need of being vetted by professionals such as news or photo editors.

"Our social tools remove older obstacles to public expression, and thus remove the bottlenecks that characterized mass media. The result is the mass amateurization of efforts previously reserved for media professionals." -Clay Shirky

Mass amateurization can also be described as a technological and cultural phenomenon whereby ordinary people access information-disseminating technologies that were historically only available to professionals. Specifically, Shirky cites collaborative projects such as Wikipedia and Linux. Here, the term "amateur", is not defined by the absence of money or skill, since the modern amateur can acquire consumer, prosumer, and professional-level technologies with increasing ease. Instead, an amateur can be described as a producer without traditional credentials or institutional training.

Amateurs and professionals are both more competent in their specialty as compared to the average member of the public. However, the hierarchy between member of the public, amateur, and professional is muddled when amateurs and professionals are evaluated against one another, as an experienced amateur may be more skilled than a mediocre professional. Via differences in ability, amateurs are able to threaten professional institutions. Institutions only have the resources to gather a certain number of professionals; in comparison, amateurs are much more prevalent due to the decreased skill requirement.

== Examples ==
The concept of mass amateurization is not limited to Web 2.0 or other digital technologies. The phenomenon has occurred throughout history as certain technologies have become more readily available to the public thanks, in part, to low transactional costs.

=== Photography ===
As the costs of camera technology fell, more and more amateurs gained accessibility to photography technology. Now average people could shoot, develop and edit their own photographs in their own time. Previously anyone taking photographs would have to have relied on the institutional model.

=== Videography ===
A fall in the cost of consumer video recording technology during the early 1980s allowed amateurs to make their own films at home. This led to the development of the genre fan film. Media associated with the fan films genre include Kid Wars, The Jedi Who Loved Me, and Boba Fett: Bounty Trail. While discussing the Star Wars prequels, filmmaker George Lucas referenced mass amateurization by stating, "Some of the special effects that we redid for Star Wars were done on a Macintosh, on a laptop, in a couple of hours.... I could have very easily shot the Young Indy TV series on Hi-8....So you can get a Hi-8 camera for a few thousand bucks, more for the software and the computer for less than $10,000 you have a movie studio."

=== Citizens band radio ===
The fall in costs of transmitter technology led to the spread of citizens band radio (CB radio for short). CB radio allowed amateurs to have control over certain frequencies in the radio spectrum that was previously reserved for use by the government or various broadcast corporations. Amateurs could tinker with equipment and use the frequencies for their own purposes.

=== Meteorology ===
As meteorological equipment and texts became more accessible, amateurs were able to scientifically monitor the weather by taking measurements with barometers and observing the skies.

=== Astronomy ===
Astronomy can now be performed by amateurs thanks to the availability of binoculars and telescopes. Many amateur astronomers make a contribution to astronomy by monitoring variable stars, tracking asteroids and discovering transient objects, such as comets. A notable example, amateur astronomer Thomas Bopp is co-credited with discovering Comet Hale–Bopp.

== Mass amateurization and the Internet ==
In addition to whole websites and applications, Web 2.0 has also birthed a variety of digital tools that facilitate organization and problem solving on a large scale. These tools include tags, trackbacks, and hashtags. These new forms of media became widely available during the first decade of the 21st century due in part to the fall of transactional costs of creating and distributing media. Internet technologies foster disintermediation and new forms of collaboration within the digital space.

=== Wikis ===
Wikis allow for the mass amateurization of encyclopedic authorship. They typically have a set of rules and guidelines that allow amateurs to navigate and contribute to a collection of knowledge. All that is typically necessary to edit a wiki is an email address. All that is required to remain a member of a wiki editor community is to obey the rules and guidelines of said wiki. This manifestation of mass amateurization allows amateur researchers and authors to directly compete with institutionally established encyclopedias and other collections such as Encyclopædia Britannica.

Examples of wikis include:

- Wikipedia
- Wikimedia Commons
- WikiHow
- Wiktionary
- WikiVoyage
- Wikibooks
- Wookieepedia

=== Photo-sharing ===
Pictures are organized on Flickr using a combination of digital tools and mass amateurization.

Photo sharing websites such as Flickr allows amateur photographers to publish and share photographs at no cost, providing users access to a community of photographers that might have previously been only accessible to those paying for photography classes at an institution. In this space, users can receive criticism and guidance from other photographers.

=== YouTube ===
YouTube hosts millions of videos that are the result of mass amateurization.

YouTube is a popular platform for the mass amateurization of video. Amateur filmmakers and hundreds of other hobbyists can share videos with the world at no cost. The ability to publish videos and films was formerly reserved for those professionals who could afford to own and operate television stations and film studios.

=== Airbnb ===
Airbnb has allowed for the mass amateurization of the hospitality industry. Users of the site can find places to stay during their travels without having to patronize professional institutions.

See also CouchSurfing.

=== Citizen media ===
Citizen media refers to forms of content produced by private citizens who are otherwise not professional journalists and/or not associated with formal institutions.

Mass amateurization is considered to be "the principal threat" to all newspapers, as opposed to other, institutionalized newspapers. Other media industries in general have suffered from the fall of transactional costs and the advent of "communication tools that are flexible enough to match our social capabilities." In particular, the mass amateurization has led to an increase in international news reporting that would not be financially justifiable in the professional model of publishing. Lazaroui points out that "Many people in the newspaper business missed the significance of the internet (the only threats they tended to take seriously were from other professional media outlets). The media industries have suffered from the recent collapse in communications costs. The future presented by the internet is the mass amateurization of publishing."

In some instances, an overlap occurs between professionals and amateurs where professional organizations will utilize media produced by amateurs. One example is the usage of firsthand footage of a "newsworthy" event by a professional news outlet that would otherwise be unavailable.

However, other crossovers have had negative results. In 2005, the Los Angeles Times attempted to offer its online readers access to its "Wikitorial", which allowed users to edit and contribute the website's editorial page. This led to widespread vandalism throughout the article and eventually its removal.

Examples of citizen media in the Web 2.0 space include Reddit and any blog wherein the author conducts original investigative journalism.

=== Social media ===
In modern news, social media has become a major source of amateur reporting. The Arab Spring is believed to have been aided by citizen journalism that was reported using and disseminated by Facebook and Twitter. The userbase of the most popular social medias range from 15 million users to 900 million users , and as their user base grows stronger, amateur reporting's base expands as well.

=== Editing and publishing ===
Sites like Writer's University have led to the mass amateurization of editing while hundreds of fanfiction sites have led to the amateurization of publishing. Amateur writing sites encourage "beta readers" to work with amateur authors in order to guide them and help them to improve their writing. Sites like these completely circumvent the need for formal editorial institutions. The advent of E-book readers has further allowed amateur authors to distribute their work.

== Institutions vs. collaboration ==
A notable result of mass amateurization is the ability for amateurs to compete with professional institutions. In a 2005 TED Talk, Shirky claimed that amateurs in a state of collaboration have great advantages over those who are members of an institution.

=== Concept ===
Institutions are created as answers to problems and rely on a professional class of people to develop such answers. These professionals are brought together, often to a single location, and compensated to collaborate on problems. Merely assembling these professionals is costly. The institution often spends a great deal of time, effort and money seeking, gathering, educating, training, housing, advising, and organizing these professionals. In essence, a great deal of time and effort is spent to form a "monetary and organizational relationship" that will lead to the solution of a given problem.

Institutions are also profit-driven. Specific tasks must be completed by certain deadlines or the institution will lose money. In order to function, institutions must remain commercially viable. This is not the case with non-commercial collaborative efforts, which involves a less structured process. Within institutions, "professionals are often too busy polishing their technique...to find time to read about the history of their endeavor or about the forms, styles, periods, or persons beyond their immediate work." In contrast, amateurs have time to develop their work whenever and wherever they want. They can explore new areas of their work and have greater autonomy to carry out their interest. This flexibility is a large part of why amateurs can compete with and often surpass institutions.

The effectiveness of mass amateurization is made possible because "digital culture fosters community while at the same time can be fueled by isolation." That is to say that digital culture and the Web 2.0 digital space cut down on costs typically associated with operating an institution. Amateurs in this space do not need to physically meet in order to collaborate and solve problems.

=== Collaborators and power law ===
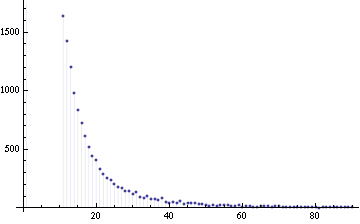
An example of a power law distribution

Amateurs, or collaborators, are not formally organized, they do not carry titles relating to their collaboration, and collaborators can have any level of skill. In Clay Shirky's example, users on Flickr fall into the definition of collaborators and they, without any institutional guidance, figured out how to solve the problem of organizing photographs. To further illustrate his point he references what is commonly known as the 80/20 rule; also known as power law distribution. By harvesting the efforts of multiple amateurs, one can end up with a more valuable result than if one had relied on the traditional institutional model. This distribution dictates that 20% of a group will produce 80% of the content. With power law, the most active contributor is far more active than the second most active, who is far more active than the rest. Here, most producers only contribute relatively minor additions. In this distribution, the mean, median, and mode are typically very different in a power law curve. Due to this contrast in production among contributors, traditional hierarchy is replaced with a heterarchical format wherein distinct roles are blurred.

According to Leadbeater, "committed amateurs" can devise effective solutions so long as they get access to the knowledge and resources they need. These resources are now more readily available today due to low transactional costs and recent technological innovations in media creation.

== Opposition ==
Within Web 2.0, amateurs have now become a legitimate threat to powerful corporations and institutions. There is an understanding that "institutions will try to preserve the problem for which they are the solution." This is referred to as the "Shirky principle." It can be inferred that institutions will oppose any mass amateurization that threatens their way of business.

== Criticism ==
=== Availability ===
While mass amateurization enables the multiplication and overabundance of content, the societal capacity to process and digest this content is all but certain. Lazaroui notes that "material published in a content-rich environment is destined to remain obscure" and therefore the benefits of mass amateurization are not as accessible to society as they could be.

=== Originality ===
Lazaroui makes the case that most amateurs are not doing any original research. Instead they rely on professional institutions to report the news and then simply "amplify" the story. He also points out that formal news-gathering institutions have grown aware of the value of original reporting that does happen and are harnessing that power for their own use. An example of this would be CNN's iReport. He charges that amateur reporters "need to focus on making this content accessible and interesting to new audiences," rather than aiding professional institutions in their news monopoly.

=== Reliability ===
In 2004, Encyclopædia Britannica editor Robert McHenry referred to Wikipedia, which allows anyone to edit its articles and refers to itself as a "faith-based encyclopedia". Citing an article on Alexander Hamilton, McHenry argues that however reliable an article may be, it is always open to be altered by someone who is uninformed.

=== Quality ===
Mass amateurization is a multi-faceted phenomenon that works under different conditions than professional organizations. In most cases, those who contribute content do so voluntarily and without monetary compensation. At the same time, amateur productions are often not high quality compared to their professional counterparts i.e. comparing an amateur blog on blogspot to one created by a staff writer for the New York Times. While amateur media is often faster and more public, professional media is seen as higher quality. However, while amateur content may not always favorably compare to its professionally produced counterpart, both play a major role in modern media.

Henry Jenkins admits that "most of what the amateurs create is gosh-awful bad," but he is quick to admit that "a thriving culture needs spaces where people can do bad art, get feedback, and get better.

=== Copyright infringement ===
The mass amateurization of film making has led to multiple cases of copyright infringement. Henry Jenkins uses the infringement upon Lucasfilm properties as an example.

=== Exploitation of amateurs ===
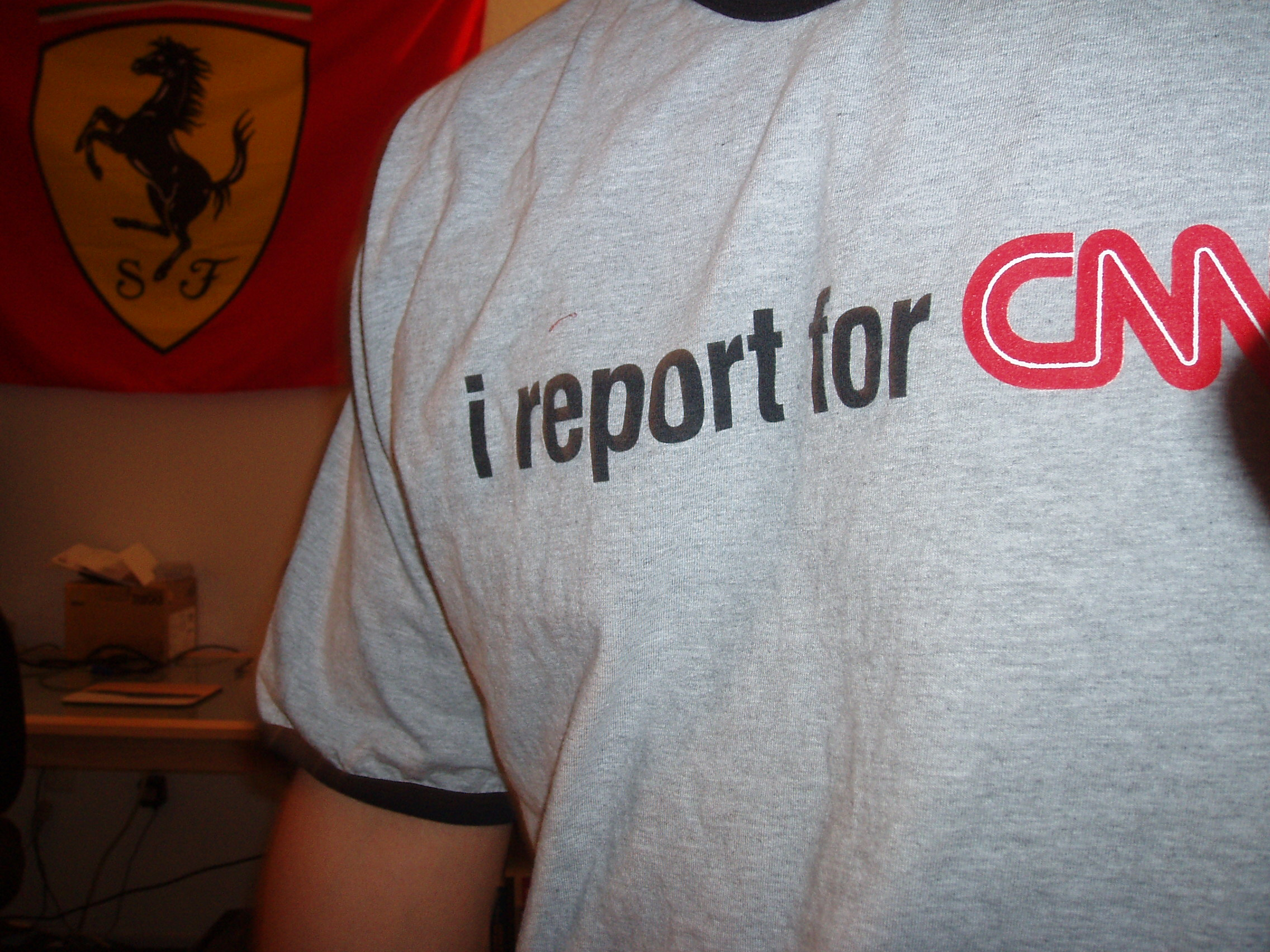
CNN rewards iReport contributors with a t-shirt. Work by contributors is more affordable when compared to a professional journalist.

Institutions have been known to harness the power of mass amateurization for their own profit thereby turning the efforts of everyday people into free labor. For example, news corporations who ask ordinary citizens to report news for them (e.g. CNN's iReport) and websites that publish amateur-generated content in place of original, professional content creation.

== See also ==
- Power Law
- Produsage
- Commons
- Clay Shirky
- Citizen Journalism
- Barefoot College
- Amateur professionalism
- Crowdsourcing

== Bibliography ==
- Endfield, Georgina H.; Morris, Carol (February 2012). "Exploring the role of the amateur in the production and circulation of meteorological knowledge". Climate Change 2012 (113): 77.
- Glaister, Dan (21 June 2015). "LA Times 'wikitorial' gives editors red faces publisher = The Guardian". Retrieved 19 February 2013.
- Lazaroui (2010). "The Creation and Communication of a Shared Social Reality". Economics, Management, and Financial Markets 5 (3): 257-265.
- Leadbeater, Charles. We-think. London: Profile, 2008. We Think. Web. 27 Feb. 2013.
- McHenry, Robert (15 November 2004). "The Faith-Based Encyclopedia". TCS Daily. Retrieved 19 February 2013.
- Shirky, Clay (2005). Clay Shirky: Institutions vs. collaboration (Video). TEDTalksDirector. Retrieved February 18, 2013.
- Shirky, Clay (2008) "Here Comes Everybody: The Power of Organizing without Organizations"
- Shirky, Clay (December 2011). "Institutions Confidence and the News Crisis". Retrieved February 27, 2013.
- Shirky, Clay (April 2010). "The Collapse of Complex Business Models". Retrieved April 1, 2013.
- Shirky, Clay (June 2009). Clay Shirky: How Social Media Can Make History (Video). TEDTalksDirector. Retrieved April 1, 2013
- Stebbins, Robert (1992) "Amateurs, Professionals, and Serious Leisure"
- Wolske, Martin, Eric Johnson, and Paul Adams. "Citizen professional toolkits: empowering communities through mass amateurization." (2010).
