= Cognitive Surplus =

Book by Clay Shirky

Cognitive Surplus: How Technology Makes Consumers into Collaborators
- Paperback edition
- Author: Clay Shirky
- Language: English
- Genre: Non-fiction
- Publisher: Penguin Group
- Publication date: Paperback – May 31, 2011
- Media type: Print (Paperback)
- Pages: 256
- ISBN: 978-0143119586

Cognitive Surplus: How Technology Makes Consumers into Collaborators is a 2010 non-fiction book by Clay Shirky, originally published in with the subtitle "Creativity and Generosity in a Connected Age". The book is an indirect sequel to Shirky's Here Comes Everybody, which covered the impact of social media. Cognitive Surplus focuses on describing the free time that individuals have to engage with collaborative activities within new media. Shirky's text searches to prove that global transformation can come from individuals committing their time to actively engage with technology. Overall response has been mixed with some critics praising Shirky's insights but also decrying some of the shortcomings of his theory.

== Background ==
Clay Shirky has long been interested in and published works concerning the Internet and its impact on society. He currently works at New York University, where he "has been making the case that the Internet is an inherently participatory and social medium".

Shirky wrote this book two years after its predecessor, Here Comes Everybody, which relates to the topics of the Internet and organization of people, was published. In it, Shirky argues that "As the Internet radically reduces the costs of collective action for everyone, it will transform the relationship between ordinary individuals and the large, hierarchical institutions that were a dominant force in 20th-century societies". This transformation of relationships between individuals is a concept Shirky builds on in Cognitive Surplus. A central concern Shirky had in mind when writing it was in illuminating the difference between communal and civic values, and how the Internet is a vehicle for both. In particular, he was interested in showing "effusions of people pooling their spare time and talent" and showing how we can create a culture "that celebrates the creation of civic value".

Shirky has stated that he is interested in exploring "the changes in the way people collaborate" that are spurred on by technology and new media, and these changes are a large part of what Cognitive Surplus is devoted to examining. Topics that Shirky frequently writes about include Network Economics, Media and Community, Internet Globalization, and Open Source Software. He has also been featured in many magazines and journals including The New York Times, Wall Street Journal and Harvard Business Review.

== Summary ==
Shirky argues that since the 1940s, people are learning how to use free time more constructively for creative acts rather than consumptive ones, particularly with the advent of online tools that allow new forms of collaboration. While Shirky acknowledges that the activities that we use our cognitive surplus for may be frivolous (such as creating LOLcats), the trend as a whole is leading to valuable and influential new forms of human expression. These forms of human collaboration that he argues the Internet provides take the form of four categories of varying degrees of value: personal, communal, public, and civic. Shirky argues that while all of these are legitimate uses of "cognitive surplus", the civic value (the power to actually change society) that social media provides is what should be celebrated about the Internet.

== Critical reception ==
The negative criticisms largely address the issue of negative uses of cognitive surplus. For example, Shirky discusses lolcats in the book, but this is a pretty innocuous example of negative or trite uses of cognitive surplus, especially considering the reality of cyber crimes, and other far more drastically negative uses. The main criticism of Shirky is that he is not realistic about the many possible ways we might waste this cognitive surplus, or worse, the many terrible ways it can and is being used for destructive and criminal activities, for example the global Jihadist movement. On the positive side, Shirky is praised for explaining the potential opportunities we can harness. He shows us effectively that we can not only make better use of our time, but also, that technology enables us to do so in a way that maximizes our ability to share and communicate.

=== Positive ===
One critic Russell Davies writes, "There are revealing thoughts in every chapter and they're particularly important for people trying to do business on the internet, because they shed light on some fundamental motivations and forces that we often miss or misconstrue". Sorin Adam Matei of Purdue University, West Lafayette writes, "Despite shortcomings, Cognitive Surplus remains overall a very well-written and generally well-informed contribution to our discussion about the social effects of social media. The academic research that shapes some of its assumptions and conclusions is well translated in everyday language," Davies describes Shirky as "the best and most helpful writer about the internet and society there is." He praised the book for elucidating the power of new technology for business. Davies says Shirky elucidated the personal/public media distinction "That explains a lot to me. It's obvious when you read it but failing to grasp the fused state of public/personal media is responsible for a lot of the things we get wrong online. We often take it to be a commercial, public media space (and we always seem to be looking for another small group of professionals out there to deal with)—but it's not just that. Things that are perfectly appropriate in public media just don't work in personal media. You wouldn't steam open people's letters and insert magazines ads, but that's sometimes how we seem to behave." Upon its release, Cognitive Surplus was praised by Tom Chatfield of The Guardian and James Harkin of The Financial Times who both are complimentary of Shirkey's depiction of the Internet and its effect on society.

=== Negative ===
His approach has been criticized by Farhad Manjoo in The New York Times for being too academic and for cheerleading positive examples of the online use of cognitive surplus. Similarly, Lehmann describes it as "the latest, monotonous installment in the sturdy tradition of exuberant web yay-saying."

Lehmann's review compares the contradictions Shirky makes in his argument about quality being democratized to hailing "a cascade of unrefereed digital content as a breakthrough in creativity and critical thought is roughly akin to greeting news of a massive national egg recall by laying off the country's food inspectors." Moreover, he objects to Shirky's selective use of anecdotes to support his point. Meanwhile, he finds it disorienting and obscene to suggest the web is hailing a new economy and abolishing class in the midst of financial distress and joblessness. He also questions Shirky's assumption that free time was squandered prior to the web and suggests instead people did useful things with their time. Furthermore, he questions the intrinsic value of time spent online as a lot of time spent online may be used for things like gambling and porn. There's nothing innately compassionate or generous about the web. For any good thing people do online, someone could also be doing something bad with the internet.

Lehmann also suggests that a cognitive surplus raises a question about what the baseline value of time spent was to begin with, "one", he claims "that might be better phrased as either 'Surplus for what?' or 'Whose surplus, white man?'" In the same vein, Lehmann accuses Shirky of being myopic. Shirky says the worst thing on the web is LOLcats when actually there are some bad things such as, for example, fake Obama birth certificates. Shirky says you cannot communicate with society on the basis of a web search to which Lehmann responds,

The idea of society as a terminally unresponsive, nonconversant entity would certainly be news to the generations of labor and gender-equality advocates who persistently engaged the social order with demands for the ballot and the eight-hour workday. It would likewise ring strangely in the ears of the leaders of the civil rights movement, who used a concerted strategy of nonviolent protest as a means of addressing an abundance-obsessed white American public who couldn't find the time to regard racial inequality as a pressing social concern. The explicit content of such protests, meanwhile, indicted that same white American public on the basis of the civic and political standards—or rather double standards—of equality and opportunity that fueled the nation's chauvinist self-regard.

Shirky bases a lot of his conclusions of generosity on the Ultimatum Game experiment to which Lehmann objects "The utility of the Ultimatum Game for a new market enabled theory of human nature thins out considerably when one realizes that the players are bartering with unearned money." and if you "Consult virtually any news story following up on a lottery winner's post-windfall life—to say nothing of the well-chronicled implosion of the past decade's market in mortgage backed securities—and you'll get a quick education in how playing games with other people's money can have a deranging effect on human behavior."

Lehmann also criticizes Shirky's expectation of the web to change economics and governmental systems. For example, he criticizes Shirky's idealising of amateurism:

As for crowdsourcing being a "labor of love" (Shirky primly reminds us that the term "amateur" "derives from the Latin amare—'to love'"), the governing metaphor here wouldn't seem to be digital sharecropping so much as the digital plantation. For all too transparent reasons of guilt sublimation, patrician apologists for antebellum slavery also insisted that their uncompensated workers loved their work, and likewise embraced their overseers as virtual family members. This is not, I should caution, to brand Shirky as a latter-day apologist for slavery but rather to note that it's an exceptionally arrogant tic of privilege to tell one's economic inferiors, online or off, what they do and do not love, and what the extra-material wellsprings of their motivation are supposed to be. To use an old-fashioned Enlightenment construct, it's at minimum an intrusion into a digital contributor's private life—even in the barrier-breaking world of Web 2.0 oversharing and friending. The just and proper rejoinder to any propagandist urging the virtues of uncompensated labor from an empyrean somewhere far above mere "society" is, "You try it, pal."

The idea of crowdsourcing as a more egalitarian economic tool also draws criticism saying crowdsourcing is just cost-cutting, much akin to outsourcing. The possibility for the web to fundamentally change the government is also questioned as

Cognitive Surplus is already aging badly, with the WikiLeaks furor showing just how little web-based traffic in raw information, no matter how revelatory or embarrassing, has upended the lumbering agendas of the old nation-state on the global chessboard of realpolitik—a place where everything has a price, often measured in human lives. More than that, though, Shirky's book inadvertently reminds us of the lesson we should have absorbed more fully with the 2000 collapse of the high-tech market: the utopian enthusiasms of our country's cyber-elite exemplify not merely what the historian E.P. Thompson called "the enormous condescension of posterity" but also a dangerous species of economic and civic illiteracy.

The Western Cold War attitude has spawned a delusion about the power of information spreading to topple authoritarian regimes. This will not be the case in Eastern countries. Paul Barrett takes a similar though softer stance, claiming all of Shirky's examples are relatively tame and mildly progressive. Moreover, Shirky presents everything as civic change when some things such as carpooling services are really stretching the term.

According to Matei, "A broader conclusion of the book is that converting 'cognitive surplus' into social capital and collective action is the product of technologies fueled by the passion of affirming the individual need for autonomy and competence." His enthusiasm for social media and for the Internet produces at times overly drawn statements. Author Jonah Lehrer criticized what he saw as Shirky's premise that forms of consumption, cultural consumption in particular, are inherently less worthy than producing and sharing.
