= Deborah Schrag =

Medical oncologist

- Citizenship: American
- Spouse: Yochai Benkler
- Awards: Member, National Academy of Medicine (2024)
- Scientific career
- Workplaces: Harvard Medical School; Memorial Sloan Kettering Cancer Center; Dana-Farber Cancer Institute

Deborah Schrag is the Chair of the Department of Medicine at Memorial Sloan Kettering Cancer Center. She currently holds the George H. Bosl Chair. She is a medical oncologist known for her work in patient care and examination of patient outcomes.

== Education and career ==
Schrag received her undergraduate degree from Harvard University where she studied the history of science. She has an M.D. from Columbia University Medical School and an M.P.H. from Harvard University's School of Public Health. She has worked at Memorial Sloan Kettering Cancer Center and the Dana–Farber Cancer Institute. In 2021 she was named chair of the department of medicine at Memorial Sloan Kettering, and as of 2024 she is the George H. Bosl Chair at Memorial Sloan Kettering Cancer Center.

== Research ==
Schrag is noted for her work in comparing the efficacy of treatments for different forms of cancer. She has examined how the timing of surgery impacts patient outcomes for women with a mutation in a BRCA gene. She led a research trial that examined the necessity of radiation therapy for rectal cancer patients.

== Selected publications ==
- Schrag, Deborah; Kuntz, Karen M.; Garber, Judy E.; Weeks, Jane C. (1997-05-15). "Decision Analysis — Effects of Prophylactic Mastectomy and Oophorectomy on Life Expectancy among Women with BRCA1 or BRCA2 Mutations". New England Journal of Medicine. 336 (20): 1465–1471. doi:10.1056/NEJM199705153362022. ISSN 0028-4793. PMID 9148160.
- Schrag, Deborah (2000-12-20). "Influence of Hospital Procedure Volume on Outcomes Following Surgery for Colon Cancer". JAMA. 284 (23): 3028–3035. doi:10.1001/jama.284.23.3028. ISSN 0098-7484. PMID 11122590.
- Iasonos, Alexia; Schrag, Deborah; Raj, Ganesh V.; Panageas, Katherine S. (2008-03-10). "How To Build and Interpret a Nomogram for Cancer Prognosis". Journal of Clinical Oncology. 26 (8): 1364–1370. doi:10.1200/JCO.2007.12.9791. ISSN 0732-183X. PMID 18323559.
- Basch, Ethan; Deal, Allison M.; Kris, Mark G.; Scher, Howard I.; Hudis, Clifford A.; Sabbatini, Paul; Rogak, Lauren; Bennett, Antonia V.; Dueck, Amylou C.; Atkinson, Thomas M.; Chou, Joanne F.; Dulko, Dorothy; Sit, Laura; Barz, Allison; Novotny, Paul (2016-02-20). "Symptom Monitoring With Patient-Reported Outcomes During Routine Cancer Treatment: A Randomized Controlled Trial". Journal of Clinical Oncology. 34 (6): 557–565. doi:10.1200/JCO.2015.63.0830. ISSN 0732-183X. PMC 4872028. PMID 26644527.
- Schrag, D.; Cramer, L. D.; Bach, P. B.; Begg, C. B. (2001-06-06). "Age and Adjuvant Chemotherapy Use After Surgery for Stage III Colon Cancer". JNCI Journal of the National Cancer Institute. 93 (11): 850–857. doi:10.1093/jnci/93.11.850. ISSN 0027-8874. PMID 11390534.
