= Network Propaganda =

2018 book by Robert Faris, Hal Roberts and Yochai Benkler

Network Propaganda: Manipulation, Disinformation and Radicalization in American Politics
- First edition
- Author: Robert Faris, Hal Roberts, and Yochai Benkler
- Language: English
- Publisher: Oxford University Press
- Publication date: 2018

Network Propaganda: Manipulation, Disinformation and Radicalization in American Politics is a 2018 book by American scholars Robert Faris, Hal Roberts, and Yochai Benkler, focusing on the negative effects of information technology on the American society and its impact on media polarization. Covering the period from the start of the 2016 election cycle to the one year anniversary of Donald Trump's inauguration, it tracks a rapid conversion of the right-wing media ecosystem from mainstream journalism with a fact-checking dynamic, to an insular self-referential model rewarding ideological consonance over factual accuracy.
