= Commons-based peer production =

Method of producing value

Commons-based peer production (CBPP) is a term coined by Harvard Law School professor Yochai Benkler. It describes a model of socio-economic production in which large numbers of people work cooperatively; usually over the Internet. Commons-based projects generally have less rigid hierarchical structures than those under more traditional business models.

One of the major characteristics of commons-based peer production is that participation is not necessarily driven by direct financial incentives. Often—but not always—commons-based projects are designed without a need for financial compensation for contributors. For example, sharing STL files for 3D-printable objects freely on the Internet enables anyone with a 3D printer to digitally replicate the object, potentially reducing costs for users who own a 3D printer.

Related concepts include co-production, crowdsourcing, and collaborative media production..

== Overview ==
The history of commons-based peer production communities (by the P2Pvalue project)

Yochai Benkler used this term as early as 2001. Benkler first introduced the term in his 2002 paper in the Yale Law Journal (published as a pre-print in 2001) "Coase's Penguin, or Linux and the Nature of the Firm", whose title refers to the Linux mascot and to Ronald Coase, who originated the transaction costs theory of the firm that provides the methodological template for the paper's analysis of peer production. The paper defines the concept as "decentralized information gathering and exchange" and credits Eben Moglen as the scholar who first identified it without naming it.

Yochai Benkler contrasts commons-based peer production with firm production, in which tasks are delegated based on a central decision-making process, and market-based production, in which allocating different prices to different tasks serves as an incentive to anyone interested in performing a task.

In his book The Wealth of Networks (2006), Yochai Benkler significantly expands on his definition of commons-based peer production. According to Benkler, what distinguishes commons-based production is that it doesn't rely upon or propagate proprietary knowledge: "The inputs and outputs of the process are shared, freely or conditionally, in an institutional form that leaves them equally available for all to use as they choose at their individual discretion." To ensure that the knowledge generated is available for free use, commons-based projects are often shared under an open license.

Not all commons-based production necessarily qualifies as commons-based peer production. According to Benkler, peer production is defined not only by the openness of its outputs, but also by a decentralized, participant-driven working method of working.

Peer production enterprises have two primary advantages over traditional hierarchical approaches to production:

1. Information gain: Peer production allows individuals to self-assign tasks that suit their own skills, expertise, and interests. Contributors can generate dynamic content that reflects the individual skills and the "variability of human creativity."
2. Great variability of human and information resources leads to substantial increasing returns to scale to the number of people, and resources and projects that may be accomplished without need for a contract or other factor permitting the proper use of the resource for a project.

In Wikinomics, Don Tapscott and Anthony D. Williams suggest an incentive mechanism behind common-based peer production. "People participate in peer production communities," they write, "for a wide range of intrinsic and self-interested reasons....basically, people who participate in peer production communities love it. They feel passionate about their particular area of expertise and revel in creating something new or better."

Aaron Krowne offers another definition:

Commons-based peer production refers to any coordinated, (chiefly) internet-based effort whereby volunteers contribute project components, and there exists some process to combine them to produce a unified intellectual work. CBPP covers many different types of intellectual output, from software to libraries of quantitative data to human-readable documents (manuals, books, encyclopedias, reviews, blogs, periodicals, and more).

== Principles ==
First, the potential goals of peer production must be modular. In other words, objectives must be divisible into components, or modules, each of which can be independently produced. That allows participants to work asynchronously, without having to wait for each other's contributions or coordinate with each other in person.

Second, the granularity of the modules is essential. Granularity refers to the degree to which objects are broken down into smaller pieces (module size). Different levels of granularity will allow people with different levels of motivation to work together by contributing small or large grained modules, consistent with their level of interest in the project and their motivation.

Third, a successful peer-production enterprise must have low-cost integration—the mechanism by which the modules are integrated into a whole end product. Thus, integration must include both quality controls over the modules and a mechanism for integrating the contributions into the finished product at relatively low cost.

== Participation ==
Participation in commons-based peer production is often voluntary and not necessarily associated with getting profit out of it. Thus, the motivation behind this phenomenon goes far beyond traditional capitalistic theories, which picture individuals as self-interested and rational agents, such portrayal is also called homo economicus.

However, it can be explained through alternative theories as behavioral economics. Famous psychologist Dan Ariely in his work Predictably Irrational explains that social norms shape people's decisions as much as market norms. Therefore, individuals tend to be willing to create value because of their social constructs, knowing that they won't be paid for that. He draws an example of a thanksgiving dinner: offering to pay would likely offend the family member who prepared the dinner as they were motivated by the pleasure of treating family members.

Similarly, commons-based projects, as claimed by Yochai Benkler, are the results of individuals acting "out of social and psychological motivations to do something interesting". He goes on describing the wide range of reasons as pleasure, socially and psychologically rewarding experiences, to the economic calculation of possible monetary rewards (not necessarily from the project itself).

On the other hand, the need for collaboration and interaction lies at the very core of human nature and turns out to be a very essential feature for one's survival. Enhanced with digital technologies, allowing easier and faster collaboration which was not as noticeable before, it resulted in a new social, cultural and economic trend named collaborative society. This theory outlines further reasons for individuals to participate in peer production such as collaboration with strangers, building or integrating into a community or contributing to a general good.

== Examples ==
Additional examples of commons-based peer production communities (by the P2Pvalue project)

One day living with commons-based peer production communities (by the P2Pvalue project)

Examples of projects using commons-based peer production include:

- Apache HTTP Server, an open-source cross-platform web server
- Wikipedia, an open-collaborative online encyclopedia
- Slashdot, a news and announcements website
- SETI@home, a volunteer computational project which searches for extra terrestrial life
- Linux, a computer operating system kernel
- Clickworkers, a citizen science program
- Kuro5hin, a discussion site for technology and culture
- Distributed Proofreaders, which proof reads public domain e-texts for publication on Project Gutenberg

== Related concepts ==
Interrelated concepts to Commons-based peer production are the processes of peer governance and peer property. To begin with, peer governance is a new mode of governance and bottom-up mode of participative decision-making that is being experimented in peer projects, such as Wikipedia and FOSS; thus peer governance is the way that peer production, the process in which common value is produced, is managed. Peer Property indicates the innovative nature of legal forms such as the General Public License, the Creative Commons, etc. Whereas traditional forms of property are exclusionary ("if it is mine, it is not yours"), peer property forms are inclusionary. It is from all of us, i.e. also for you, provided you respect the basic rules laid out in the license, such as the openness of the source code for example.

The ease of entering and leaving an organization is a feature of adhocracies.

The principle of commons-based peer production is similar to collective invention, a model of open innovation in economics coined by Robert Allen.

Also related: Open-source economics and Commercial use of copyleft works.

== Criticism ==
Some believe that the commons-based peer production (CBPP) vision, while powerful and groundbreaking, needs to be strengthened at its root because of some allegedly wrong assumptions concerning free and open-source software (FOSS).

The CBPP literature regularly and explicitly quotes FOSS products as examples of artifacts "emerging" by virtue of mere cooperation, with no need for supervising leadership (without "market signals or managerial commands", in Benkler's words).

It can be argued, however, that in the development of any less than trivial piece of software, irrespective of whether it be FOSS or proprietary, a subset of the (many) participants always play—explicitly and deliberately—the role of leading system and subsystem designers, determining architecture and functionality, while most of the people work “underneath” them in a logical, functional sense.

From a micro-level, Bauwens and Pantazis are of the view that CBPP models should be considered a prototype, since it cannot reproduce itself fully outside of the limits that capitalism has imposed on it as a result of the interdependence of CBPP with capitalist competition. The innovative activities of CBPP occur within capitalist competitive contexts, and capitalist firms can gain competitive advantage over firms that rely on personal research without proprietary knowledge, because the former is able to utilize and access the knowledge commons, especially in digital commons where participants in CBPP struggle to earn direct livelihood for themselves. CBPP is then at the risk of being subordinated.

== Alternative to capitalism ==
Proponents argue that commons-based peer production (CBPP) represents an alternative form of production from traditional capitalism. However, CBPP supporters acknowledged in 2019 that it was still a prototype of a new way of producing, and CBPP could not yet be considered a complete form of production by itself. According to Bauwens, Kostakis, and Pazaitis, CBPP "is currently a prototype since it cannot as yet fully reproduce itself outside of mutual dependence with capitalism." They claim the market and state will not disappear if CBPP triumphs over traditional capitalism (i.e., if CBPP becomes "the dominant way of allocating the necessary resources for human self-reproduction"). Rather, the market and state will become instruments in service to maintaining the commons and the development of entrepreneurs that contribute to the commons as well as help more commoners become free to also earn their living through giving to the commons.

A socio-economic shift pursued by CBPP will not be straightforward or lead to a utopia, but it could help solve some current issues. As with any economic transition, new problems will emerge and the transition will be complicated. However, proponents of CBPP argue that moving towards a CBPP production model will be ideal and a step forward for society. CBPP is still a prototype of what a new way of production and society would look like, and can't separate itself completely from capitalism: CBPP proponents believe commoners should find innovative ways to become more autonomous from capitalism. They also assert that, in a society led by commons, the market would continue to exist as in capitalism, but it would shift from being mainly extractive to being predominantly generative.

Both scenarios, the extractive as well as the generative, can include elements which are based on peer-to-peer (P2P) dynamics, or social peer-to-peer processes. Therefore, one should not only discuss peer production as an opposing alternative to current forms of market organization, but also needs to discuss how both manifest in the organizations of today’s economy. Four scenarios can be described along the lines of profit maximization and commons on one side, and centralized and decentralized control over digital production infrastructure, such as for example networking technologies: netarchical capitalism, distributed capitalism, global commons, and localized commons. Each of them uses P2P elements to a different extent and thus leads to different outcomes:

- Netarchical capitalism: In this version of capitalism, P2P elements are mainly found in digital platforms, through which individuals can interact with each other. These platforms are controlled by the platform owners, which capture the value of the P2P exchanges.
- Distributed capitalism: As compared to the first type, platforms are not centrally controlled in this form of capitalism, and individual autonomy and large-scale participation play an important role. However, it is still a form a capitalism, meaning it is mainly extractive, and profit maximization is the main motive.
- Global commons: This scenario is generative as it aims to add social and environmental value. It uses the digital commons to organize and deploy initiatives globally.
- Local commons: Similar to the global commons, the local commons are also a generative scenario. However, they use global digital commons to organize activities locally, for example by using global designs to at the same time as local supply chains for manufacturing.

== See also ==
- Anti-rival good – Economic good that has more total value when shared
- Carr–Benkler wager
- Co-creation – Product or service design process
- Cognitive Surplus – Book by Clay Shirky – a book
- Collaboration – Act of working together
- Collaborative software development model – Creation and maintenance of software
- Common ownership – Economic arrangement
- Crowdsourcing – Sourcing services or funds from a group
- Crowdsourcing software development
- Motivations of open source programmers – Open collaboration movement supporting open-source licenses
- Gamification – Using game design elements in non-games
- Decentralized planning (economics) – Type of economic system
- Distributed manufacturing – Coordinated decentralized manufacturing
- Fablab – Small-scale workshop for digital fabrication
- Gift economy – Mode of exchange where valuables are given without rewards
- Here Comes Everybody – 2008 book by Clay Shirky
- Knowledge commons – Collectively shared and managed information
- Mass collaboration – Many people working on a single project
- Nonformal learning – Category of learning situation
- Open collaboration – Collaboration with a result open to all
- Peer learning – Educational practice of interaction among students
- Peer review – Evaluation by peers with similar expertise
- Production for use – Economic concept
- Prosumer – Person who consumes and produces a product
- Open business – Business approach that draws on ideas from openness movements
- Open manufacturing – Model of localised production
- Open music model – Framework for the recording industry
- Open-source hardware – Hardware whose design source files are made available
- Social peer-to-peer processes – Type of decentralized and distributed network architecture
