= Commercial use of copyleft works =

Ethical dilemma

The commercialization of copylefted works differs fundamentally if a free and open copyleft license is used or if the copyleft license is de facto a commercial one, restricting certain use cases. The economics for free and open copyleft works tends to be on the commercialization of other scarcities, and complimentary goods rather than the free works themselves. One way to make money with copylefted works is to sell consultancy and support to the users of the work.

== Internal use ==
Businesses and governments can obtain value and cut costs by using copyleft software internally. See for example Linux adoption.

== Development ==
By building on existing free software, businesses can reduce their development costs. With software that is copyleft, the business will then have the disadvantage that selling licences is rarely possible (because anyone can distribute copies at no financial cost), but the business will have the advantage that their competitors can't incorporate that improved version into a product and then distribute it without that competitor also making the modifications they authored available to the original distributor, thereby avoiding a type of free-rider problem.

Copyleft enables volunteer programmers and organizations to feel involved and contribute to software and feel confident any future derivatives will remain accessible to them, and that their contributions are part of a larger goal, like developing the kernel of an operating system (OS). Copylefting software makes clear the intent of never abusing or hiding any knowledge that is contributed. Copyleft also ensures that all contributing programmers and companies cannot fork proprietary versions, thereby gaining a commercial advantage over another.

== Distribution ==
Excluding some notable exceptions like the operating systems endorsed by the Free Software Foundation as compliant with the GNU FSDG (Free System Distribution Guidelines), most Linux distribution projects don't actively seek to limit the amount of proprietary software they distribute, or restrict the proliferation of non-free licenses in connection with the distributions the develop and maintain.

UserLinux, a project set up by Bruce Perens, supported the emergence of such small-scale business based on free software, that is, copylefted or otherwise freely licensed computer programs. The UserLinux website showcased some case studies and success stories of such businesses. However, as Canonical Ltd. and Ubuntu gained popularity, the UserLinux project never shipped any software and was ultimately abandoned.

== Art ==
Often copylefted artistic works can be seen to have a (supporting) publicity function, promoting other works, which may or may not be proprietary, by the same artist(s). Artists sticking to an uncompromising copylefting of the whole of their artistic output, could, in addition to services and consultancy, revert to some sort of patronage, or to other sources of income, not related to their artistic production.

Some artists, such as Girl Talk and Nine Inch Nails, use copyleft licenses such as the Creative Commons Attribution-NonCommercial-ShareAlike license that don't allow commercial use. In this way they can choose to sell the works they invented without having to compete with others selling copies of the same works. However, some argue that the Attribution-NonCommercialShareAlike license is not a true copyleft, as it does not preserve freedom for the users of the work, as the noncommercial restriction renders the work proprietary.

Where copylefted art has a large audience of modest means or a small audience of considerable wealth, the act of releasing the art may be offered for sale. See Street Performer Protocol. This approach can be used for the release of new works, or can be used to relicense proprietary works as copylefted works, e.g. Blender.

== See also ==
- Business models for open-source software
- Open-source economics
- Commons-based peer production
