= The Wealth of Networks =

2006 book by Yochai Benkler

The Wealth of Networks: How Social Production Transforms Markets and Freedom
- Original 1st edition cover
- Author: Yochai Benkler
- Language: English
- Subject: Social and economic impact of networked information technology, the cultural commons...
- Publisher: Yale University Press
- Publication date: 2006
- Publication place: United States
- Media type: Print (paperback)
- Pages: 515
- ISBN: 978-0-300-12577-1

The Wealth of Networks: How Social Production Transforms Markets and Freedom is a book by Harvard Law School professor Yochai Benkler published by Yale University Press on April 3, 2006. The book has been recognized as one of the most influential works of its time concerning the rise and impact of the Internet on the society, particularly in the sphere of economics. It also helped popularize the term Benkler coined few years earlier, the commons-based peer production (CBPP).

A PDF of the book is downloadable under a Creative Commons Noncommercial Share-alike license. Benkler has said that his editable online book is "an experiment of how books might be in the future", demonstrating how authors and readers might connect instantly or even collaborate.

== Summary ==
=== Part 1: The networked information economy ===
Benkler describes the current epoch as a "moment of opportunity" due to the emergence of what he terms the Networked Information Economy (NIE), a "technological-economic feasibility space" that is the result of the means of producing media becoming more socially accessible. Benkler states that his methodology in the text is to look at social relations using economics, liberal political theory, and focuses on individual actions in nonmarket relations.

Benkler sees communication and information as the most important cultural and economic outputs of advanced economies. He traces the emergence and development of various communications (radio, newspapers, television) through the 19th and 20th centuries as functions of increasingly centralized control due to the high cost factor of production, and believes that media was thus produced on an industrial scale. Benkler's term for this is the industrial information economy.

With the emergence of computers, networks, and increasingly affordable media production outlets, Benkler introduces the concept of the NIE, which sees media access as a form of power, and recognizes decentralized individual actions in said media as a result of the removal of physical and economic constraints to the creation of media. To Benkler, this is due to a new feasibility space: lowered costs of access via digital production and radical decentralization rather than centralized messaging ("coordinate coexistence", 30).

This results in emerging productions of information that use non-proprietary strategies (such as GNU licences and collaborative production formats).

==== Goods ====
The forms of cultural productions—music is an example Benkler uses frequently—are either rival or nonrival. Rival products decrease as they are used (e.g. pounds of flour), the use of nonrival products (e.g. listening to a song) does not decrease their availability for further use.

Static vs. dynamic efficiency: one premise of exclusive rights has always been that only financial incentives can facilitate participation in information production. Benkler argues that in an age where computers reduce the cost of production, the equation of innovation-to-rights shifts as well.

The declining cost of communication means that in the networked society there are fewer barriers for individual cultural production that are "meaningful" to other users. Thus, in network economy, "human capacity becomes primary scarce resource".

==== Peer production ====
To close this section, Benkler argues that the networked environment makes possible a new modality of organizing production: that of commons-based peer production. He discusses the parameters of the commons and gives the example of free and open-source software. He discusses shared acts of communication (utterances, reviews, distribution of information) and goods (like server space). Lastly, he draws a contrast to the regulation and rival resource of radio spectrum bandwidth and the sharability of space in a digital commons.

==== Economics of social production ====
Benkler argues here that the networked society allows for the emergence of non-hierarchical groups that are committed to information production. Open software is one of the ways one can view the emergence of this new form of information production. "Commons-based" peer production eschews traditional rational choice models offered by economists. Benkler details some of the key components of this new economy based not on financial remuneration but on user-involvement, accreditation, and tools that promote collaboration between individuals.

In order to understand why people engage in production aside from financial incentives, Benkler argues that one can distinguish two types of motivation:

1. Extrinsic motivation: motivation that comes from outside in the form of financial reward, punishment, etc.
2. Intrinsic motivation: motivation that derives from within oneself, such as the pleasure involved in completing a task.

=== Part 2: The political economy of property and commons ===
In this section, Benkler examines the relationship of individual access to participation in the dissemination and creation of information via communication systems, building on his earlier ideas of commons-based peer production.

He examines the historical emergence of the mass media, looking at the relationship between print and radio and ever-broadening, industrial broadcast models of production which became supported by advertising. The criticisms of mass media which Benkler brings up include:

- its commercialism, because he sees that as supporting the development of programs that appeal to large audiences rather than specific interests, in the name of mass broadcasting;
- limited intake of information, due to the relatively small number of people gathering information;
- too much power assigned to too few people.

Benkler moves from this overview and criticism to exploring what this text describes as the potential for networked communications to do:

"Better access to knowledge and the emergence of less capital-dependent forms of productive social organization offer the possibility that the emergence of the networked information economy will offer up opportunities for improvement in economic justice, on scales both global and local."

==== From passive to active ====
For Benkler, another key component of the network society is that individuals are more active in producing their education and cultural production. According to him, online encyclopedias such as Wikipedia allow for users to create rather than just consume knowledge and information.

=== Part 3: Policies of freedom at a moment of transformation ===
Benkler begins chapter 10 stating two early views on the anticipated social impact the internet would have on the users and their community:

Firstly, the internet removed the user from society and allowed the individual to lead a life that was no longer molded by the interactions and experiences of a physical tangible civilisation with others. The second view was that using the internet would widen the field of a user's community by providing a novel system of communication and interaction.

He observes that users show enhanced relationships with their close contacts while increasing the numbers of less close contacts with relationships maintained through internet mediated interaction. He believes this latter change stems from the shift from the one-to-many model of media distribution to a many-to-many model where it is more user centered and controlled.

Benkler remarks that the early views were made on the premise that internet communication would replace real-world forms communication rather than co-exist alongside it. He introduces the idea of the networked individual who governs their own interactions and microcommunity roles in both real and virtual space and dynamically switches between when needed, eventually concluding that the early views were nostalgic and somewhat fatuous.

A definition is offered whereby cultural freedom occupies a position that relates to both political and individual autonomy, but is synonymous with neither. Benkler then goes on to add that culture is significant because that is the context within which people exist – these are their shared understandings, frameworks, meanings and references.

== Reception ==
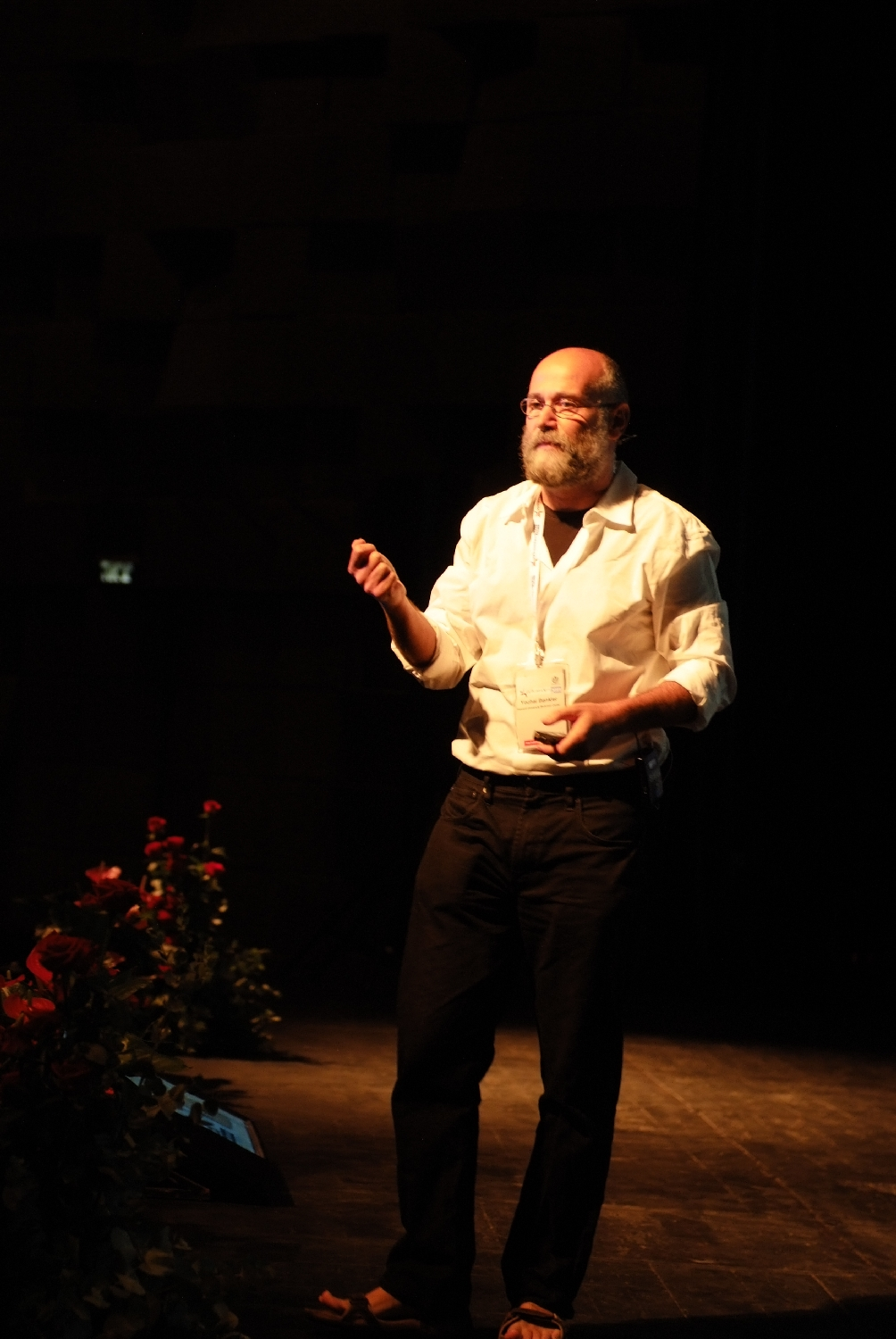
2011-08 Haifa Wikimania Yochai Benkler DSCF6547

=== Blogs ===
When Benkler's The Wealth of Networks was released in 2006, Lawrence Lessig announced the release of the book on his blog, stating: “This is—by far—the most important and powerful book written in the fields that matter most to me in the last ten years. If there is one book you read this year, it should be this.” The Wealth of Networks has been reviewed by many other blogs in addition to the Lessig blog, including Rough Type, Dreams in Digital, denoer, and Reading Media Under The Tree. Less than a month after its release in 2006, The Wealth of Networks became the focus of an intense read and review seminar on the political blog Crooked Timber. After reading the book, six scholars (several of them founding members of crookedtimbre.org) posted their reactions to the book, and at the end of the seminar, Yochai Benkler was given the opportunity to respond to the comments.

=== Mass media ===
Book reviews of The Wealth of Networks have also been featured by several news publications, including Financial Times, The Times, and the New Statesman.

=== Academic journals ===
The book has been also reviewed in academic journals such as Global Media and Communication, Information Economics and Policy, Information Processing & Management, International Journal of Technology, Knowledge, and Society, Journal of Business and Technical Communication, Journal of Media Economics,Journal on Telecommunications and High Technology Law, Journalism and Mass Communication Quarterly, Scandinavian Journal of Management, Social Science Computer Review, Rue Descartes, The Communication Review, The German Law Journal, The Independent Review, The University of Chicago Law Review, The Yale Law Journal, and Theory, Culture & Society.

=== Other ===
In addition to book reviews, interviews with Yochai Benkler about The Wealth of Networks have been conducted and published by openDemocracy.net, openBusiness.cc, and Public Knowledge, and Benkler was invited to give a lecture based on The Wealth of Networks at the Center for American Progress on May 31, 2006.

== Criticism ==
=== Writing style ===
In terms of Benkler's writing style, criticism on Crooked Timber targeted two main points: 1) that the book is written in a style that is too dense for the average reader, and 2) that it attempts to cover too many topics. As Dan Hunter points out in his review titled "A General Theory of Information Policy", The Wealth of Networks is an attempt to articulate an underlying, grander "whole" that ties together the myriad issues involved in information policy and the internet. Hunter states: "Benkler provides something close to a General Theory of Information Policy for the networked age that begins to explain how we should think about topics as different as spectrum policy, copyright, user-generated content, network neutrality…well, the list pretty much encompasses all questions within internet law and policy." Hunter's main criticism of the book is that it is too academically dense for the average reader, and too reliant on assuming the reader is familiar with several internet organizations and websites, such as Wikipedia, PayPal, and Slashdot. As Hunter later states:

"I'm worried that too many of the peer-producers—the blog writers, the open source software gurus, the amateurs who create for the love of it; in short the people who this book is written about—will pick up this work in the hope of understanding how their creativity fits into the grand scheme of innovation, and what their role will be in the amateur production sphere that promises to change the way that we view information goods within society. And they may not get past the introduction."

=== Physical hardware and infrastructure ===
Another criticism of Benkler's theory is that so much focus is given to the potential of peer-production and innovation in the networked information economy, but little to no attention spent addressing issues related to the physical hardware required to keep the network that Benkler's theories rely on up and running. In a review of the book by Siva Vaidhyanathan, Benkler's "soft technological determinism" is brought under fire. Vaidhyanathan states:

"This one issue remains underwritten in the text: the story of the technology itself. Throughout the text, there seems to be an almost givenness about the technology. TCP/IP is just there. Even Cisco's notorious discriminating servers, the source of so much tension over the end of network neutrality, just appear... . We get a sense that particular technologies are malleable, adaptable, contingent, and socially shaped. We get no account of developer's wishes or users' adaptions. We only get cursory accounts of the conflicts over the future of these technologies that have unleashed (to choose a loaded term) so much creativity."

Benkler addressed this criticism in his response to Vaidhyanathan's review, conceding that perhaps more attention to the physical elements of the networked information economy could have been given:

"His [Vaidhyanathan's] complaint ... is that I wrote a book about how the dynamics of technology, society, economy, and law intersect to fundamentally alter how information, knowledge, and culture are produced, rather than a book about the dynamics of how the technology component itself got to be as it is, and how it may or may not change given present pressures ... not every book can be about everything. Perhaps Vaidhyanathan is correct that a book that offers as broad a canvass as this on the networked information environment needs a chapter on the technology itself: where it originates and what are the dynamics and pressures, historically and today, that led to its past and that affect its future."

In a review of the book by Ben Peters, a similar sentiment to Vaidhyanathan's criticism is expressed: "It may also do very well to account for massive information infrastructure costs, the fiber optic cables, the wifi, and the laptops that the Benkler's optimism depends upon in the international development scene." In The Independent Review: A Journal of Political Economy, Peter G. Klein stated:

"Although information itself cannot be 'owned,' the tangible media in which information is embedded and transmitted are scarce economic goods. Information may yearn to be 'free,' but cables, switches, routers, disk drives, microprocessors, and the like yearn to be owned. Such innovations do not spring from nowhere; they are the creations of profit-seeking entrepreneurs that consumers or other entrepreneurs purchase to use as they see fit."

=== Optimism ===
Derek Belt, who reviewed the book on his blog titled "Dreaming in Digital", targeted Benkler's optimism as his main point of criticism, suggesting that Benkler's optimism was too rooted in what was possible in the future, neglecting to take into consideration the position in which we as a society find ourselves in at the present time in relation to information policy. He states:

"His unwavering belief in the greater good offers hope for the future but fails to adequately address the present, leaving readers to wonder what he would have said about the prospects of another decade in which the industrial information economy, backed by powerful lobbyists and defiant legislative activity, holds all of the cards. Would our future look so cheery then?"

In contrast to these attacks on Benkler's optimism, a review by Debora Halbert suggested that:

"Although he is generally pro-technology, especially regarding the Internet, Benkler is not a techno-utopianist. He argues that techno-utopianists who see the Internet as a perfect public platform are incorrect, but so are the technophobes who believe the Internet simply leads to increasing fragmentation and alienation. He seeks to strike a middle ground, arguing that the industrial media model of central control over mass communication fits nicely with authoritarian structures."

Jack Balkin, a participant on in the Crooked Timber read and review took a similar stance in his interpretation of Benkler's optimism, stating:

"Benkler's book wavers between an optimistic description of what the digitally networked economy has produced and will produce and a warning that these bounties will be squandered if the legal regime goes in the wrong direction...as much as Benkler might wish that features of the digitally networked environment and information economics will lead us inevitably toward a blessed world of peer production, he well understands that the political economy of information production has repeatedly pushed the law along a different path. Benkler shows us a vibrant world that we are moving toward and might yet achieve; but it is up to us to realize it."

The Wealth of Networks has been criticized for technological determinism. David M. Berry contends that Benkler's work builds on "a rather shaky binary distinction between proprietary industrial forms of economic and technological structure and non-proprietary peer-production models". Berry challenges Benkler's assumptions that network fosters non-proprietary models and that the latter are sounder and ethically preferable to the former model. According to Berry, Benkler fails to recognize that should network forms of organization happen to be wealth generating, "they will be co-opted into mainstream 'industrial' ways of production. To paraphrase Steve Jobs, the corporate world may soon provide peer-production for the rest of us." Johan Söderberg links Benkler's optimism towards networked modes of production to a larger current of thought generated by the hacker community. Drawing on Serge Proulx' work, Söderberg asserts that such a narrative, neoliberal in origin, recomposes the discussion on information society in a problematic way: "The fantasy of a frictionless market in information is transformed into a vision of an information-sharing society".

== Praise ==
=== Future of information policy and network development ===
Although The Wealth of Networks has been the target of pointed criticism, the vast majority of published reviews are very emphatic about the fact that despite certain criticisms, The Wealth of Networks is an incredibly important book, and brings to the table many issues that are pertinent to the future of information policy and network development. Benkler is credited with bringing forth new perspectives related to social production, the role of the commons, how society is using and interacting with the internet, and how the internet is transforming the way people interact, create, and exchange goods and information. As Siva Vaidhyanathan stated in the opening of his review, "there is no better place to turn for an account of the processes of creativity and commerce relating to digital networks and the work that people do with them." More specifically, The Wealth of Networks is also hailed as an incredibly important piece of writing for those advocating for greater protection of the cultural commons and open access models on the Internet. For the German Law Journal, James Brink wrote:

"The Wealth of Networks is a worthwhile outward- and forward-looking manifesto for an information infrastructure that has come of age. At the same time, internet advocates would do well to take Benkler's lessons in the history of the industrial information economy to heart, and to work hard to fulfill his vision of a true commons-based and nonproprietary ecology within the networked information economy."

== See also ==
- Carr-Benkler wager
- Information ecology
- Sharing economy
- The Wealth of Nations
