= Clay Shirky =

American technology writer (born 1964)

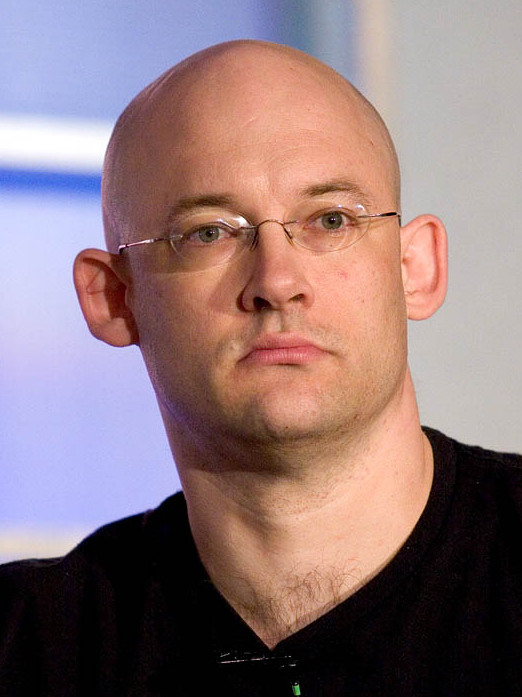
- Shirky on the Folksonomy panel at the 2005 O'Reilly Emerging Technology Conference

Vice Provost for AI and Technology in Education at New York University
- Incumbent
- Assumed office 2017

Chief Information Officer of NYU Shanghai
- In office 2014–2017

Personal details
- Born: Clay Shirky; 1964 (age 61–62) Columbia, Missouri, U.S.
- Education: Yale University (BA)
- Occupation: Writer, consultant, lecturer

Clay Shirky (born 1964) is an American pundit, writer, and consultant on the social and economic effects of Internet technologies and journalism.

In 2017 he was appointed Vice Provost for AI and Technology in Education at New York University (NYU), after serving as Chief Information Officer at NYU Shanghai from 2014 to 2017. He also is an associate professor at the Arthur L. Carter Journalism Institute and Associate Arts Professor at the Tisch School of the Arts' Interactive Telecommunications Program.

He has written and been interviewed about the Internet since 1996. His columns and writings have appeared in Business 2.0, The New York Times, The Wall Street Journal, the Harvard Business Review and Wired. Shirky divides his time between consulting, teaching, and writing on the social and economic effects of Internet technologies. His consulting practice is focused on the rise of decentralized technologies such as peer-to-peer, web services, and wireless networks that provide alternatives to the wired client–server infrastructure that characterizes the World Wide Web.

== Education and career ==
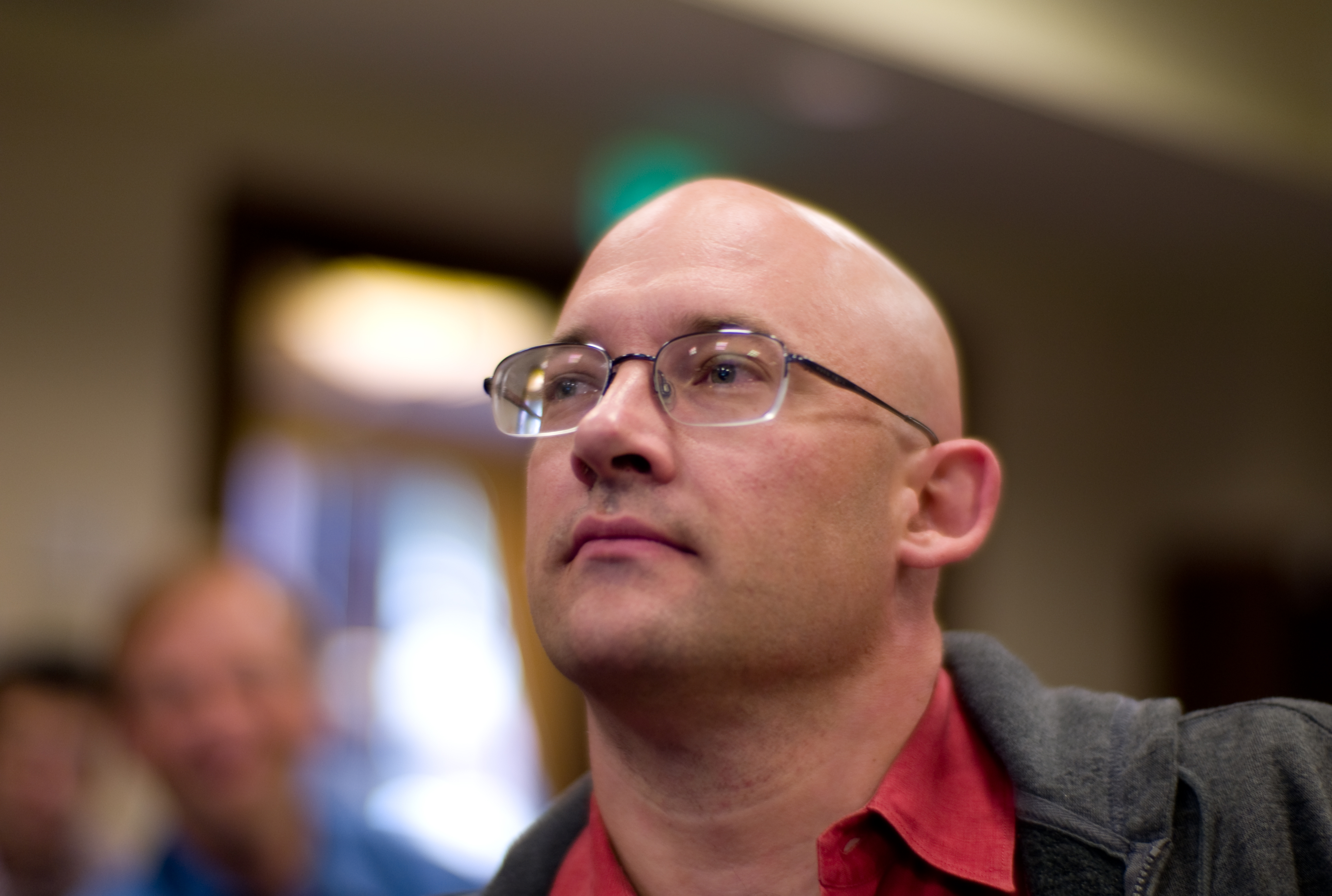
Shirky in 2007

After graduating from Yale University with a Bachelor of Arts degree in fine art in 1986, he moved to New York. In the 1990s he founded the Hard Place Theater, a theatre company that produced non-fiction theater using only found materials such as government documents, transcripts and cultural records and also worked as a lighting designer for other theater and dance companies, including the Wooster Group, Elevator Repair Service and Dana Reitz. During this time, Shirky was vice-president of the New York chapter of the Electronic Frontier Foundation, and wrote technology guides for Ziff Davis. He appeared as an expert witness on cyberculture in Shea v. Reno, a case cited in the U. S. Supreme Court's decision to strike down the Communications Decency Act in 1996.

He was a member of the Wikimedia Foundation's advisory board.

Shirky was the first Professor of New Media in the Media Studies department at Hunter College, where he developed the MFA in Integrated Media Arts program.

In the Fall of 2010, Shirky was a visiting Morrow Lecturer at Harvard University's John F. Kennedy School of Government instructing a course titled: "New Media and Public Action".

== Views ==
In his book Here Comes Everybody, Shirky explains how he has long spoken in favor of crowdsourcing and collaborative efforts online. He uses the phrase "the Internet runs on love" to describe the nature of such collaborations. In the book, he discusses the ways in which the action of a group adds up to something more than just aggregated individual action borrowing the phrase "more is different" from physicist Philip Warren Anderson.

Shirky asserts that collaborative crowdsourced work results from "a successful fusion of a plausible promise, an effective tool, and an acceptable bargain with the users." He states that the promise of what the user will get out of participating in a project leads to a person's desire to get involved. Collaborators will then choose the best social networking tool to do the job. One that "must be designed to fit the job being done, and it must help people do something they actually want to do." The bargain, Shirky states, defines what collaborators expect from each other's participation in the project. Shirky's 'Promise, Tool, Bargain' premise restates aspects of the Uses and Gratifications Theory of mass media research.

He points to four key steps. The first is sharing, a sort of "me-first collaboration" in which the social effects are aggregated after the fact; people share links, URLs, tags, and eventually come together around a type. This type of sharing is a reverse of the so-called old order of sharing, where participants congregate first and then share (examples include Flickr, and Delicious). The second is conversation, that is, the synchronization of people with each other and the coming together to learn more about something and to get better at it. The third is collaboration, in which a group forms under the purpose of some common effort. It requires a division of labor, and teamwork. It can often be characterized by people wanting to fix a market failure, and is motivated by increasing accessibility.

The fourth and final step is collective action, which Shirky says is "mainly still in the future." The key point about collective action is that the fate of the group as a whole becomes important.

Shirky also introduces his theory of mass amateurization:

Our social tools remove older obstacles to public expression, and thus remove the bottlenecks that characterized mass media. The result is the mass amateurization of efforts previously reserved for media professionals.

Combined with the lowering of transaction costs associated with creating content, mass amateurization of publishing changes the question from "Why publish this?" to "Why not?" Tied to mass amateurization is the idea of publish-then-filter which is now required due to the mere size and amount of material being created on a daily basis. Shirky calls this mass amateurization of filtering a forced move. He uses the Portland Pattern Repository, which introduced the wiki concept that inspired Wikipedia, as an example of this new marriage of mass content creation and mass filtering.

External videos
- Presentation by Shirky on Cognitive Surplus at Google Headquarters, Mountain View, CA, June 25, 2010, C-SPAN

In 2010 Shirky published Cognitive Surplus: Creativity and Generosity in a Connected Age which expands on themes introduced in Here Comes Everybody. The book follows concepts he introduced in a Web 2. 0 conference presentation April 23, 2008 called "Gin, Television, and Social Surplus", Herein he popularizes the concept of cognitive surplus, the time freed from watching television which can be enormously productive when applied to other social endeavors. Technology has turned many past consumers into producers. This new production capacity, combined with humanity's willingness to share, can change society if applied to civic endeavors.

Shirky introduces Cognitive Surplus as a continuation of his work in Here Comes Everybody. "This book picks up where that one left off, starting with the observation that the wiring of humanity lets us treat free time as a shared global resource, and lets us design new kinds of participation and sharing that take advantage of that resource."

Shirky has also written about "algorithmic authority," which describes the process through which unverified information is vetted for its trustworthiness through multiple sources.

=== Institutions vs collaboration ===
In July 2005, Shirky gave a talk titled "Institutions vs collaboration" as a part of TEDGlobal 2005. This presentation reveals many of the ideas and concepts that would ultimately be presented in Here Comes Everybody and in future TED talks. Shirky compares the coordination costs between groups formed under traditional institutions and those formed by groups which "build cooperation into the infrastructure." Classic institutions have to create economic, management, legal and physical structures and inherently, by creating these rigid structures, must exclude large numbers of people. Companies like Flickr, however, having built "cooperation into the infrastructure" of their company, do not have to build massive infrastructure nor exclude large groups of potential contributors.

Shirky states that since many social systems follow the Pareto principle wherein 20% of contributors account for 80% of contributions, traditional institutions lose out of the long tail of contributors by turning only the few that dominate the distribution into employees. The cooperative infrastructure model escapes having to lose this resource. Shirky presents an institution as enabler and institution as obstacle concept. The relatively small number of high-volume contributors can be assimilated, as employees, into the old-style corporate model and thus can live in an "institution-as-enabler world". The long tail of contributors, however, who make few and infrequent contributions, see institutions as an obstacle as they would never have been hired, therefore, disenfranchised. Shirky argues that an idea or contribution may be infrequent and significant. Furthermore, all of the long tail contributors, taken in aggregate, can be substantial.

One pitfall of the "mass amateurs" creating their own groups is that not all niches that are filled will be positive ones; Shirky presents pro-ana groups as an example. Shirky closes by stating that the migration from institutions to self-organizing, collaborative groups will be incomplete and will not end in a utopian society. Rather, chaos will follow as was created by the advent of the printing press before it, and that this period of transition will last roughly fifty years.

Shirky claims that our actions and behavior are generated by convenience. Writer and analyst Megan Garber writes: "The more people we have participating in media, and the more people we have consuming it—and the more people we have, in particular, creating it—the better. Not because bigger is implicitly better than the alternative compact, but because abundance changes the value proposition of media as a resource."

According to Jay Baer by making collaboration more convenient for the user, it will eventually become a more commonplace. Further, enhancing the outcome of collaboration will instill motivation within the users.

According to Audrey Tang, Shirky has coined the phrase "cognitive surplus", to describe the way that time spent on the internet can have an increasing social value.

=== Evolution of asymmetric media ===
In June 2009, Shirky participated in a TED@State talk titled "How cellphones, Twitter and Facebook can make history" aka "How social media can make history." In the talk, he explains that this is the first time in history that communication is possible from many to many. In the past, communication to a large group excluded the possibility of having a conversation, and having a conversation meant not interacting with a group and instead was necessarily a one-to-one structure. Shirky labels this incongruous exchange as asymmetric. In Shirky's view, this feature is one of the main reasons that the internet revolution is different from communication revolutions that preceded it.

The second difference between the twentieth and twenty-first century communication revolution, Shirky states, is now all media is digitized. This means that the Internet now encapsulates all forms of media from the past and the medium itself has become the site of exchange, not just a means of exchange.

Finally, the Internet allows people to create content, thus the line between producers and consumers has become blurred. As Shirky puts it, "Every time a new consumer joins this media landscape, a new producer joins as well." Even countries like China, as Shirky gives as an example, go to great lengths to control information exchange on the Internet but are having trouble as the "amateurization" of media creation has effectively turned every owner of a cellphone and Twitter account into a journalist. The populace as a whole, Shirky claims, is a force much harder to control than a handful of professional news sources. He compares the "Great Firewall of China" to the Maginot Line as both were built to protect from external threats but that is not where the majority of content is being created in this new media landscape.

As an example of the potential of this two-way, collaborative environment Shirky believes we are now living in, he presents as a case study MyBarackObama.com. Over the issue of the Foreign Intelligence Surveillance Act, members of the website were upset over Obama's announcement that he was changing his stance and that now he was going to sign the bill "that granted immunity for possibly warrantless spying on American persons." Despite the disagreement between the President and the posters opposed to his altered view, Shirky cites the mere fact that the President posted a reply to their concerns, instead of persecuting/ignoring the group, as hope for the future of this new form of mass media.

=== Shirky principle ===
In April 2010, Kevin Kelly cited the phrase "Institutions will try to preserve the problem to which they are the solution", and called it the "Shirky Principle", as the phrasing reminded him of the clarity of the Peter Principle.

=== Communal value vs civic value ===
In June 2010, Shirky participated in TED@Cannes wherein he spoke about cognitive surplus and its role furthering communal and civic value. The talk was titled, "How cognitive surplus will change the world," and the possibility for change, which Shirky presents, runs the spectrum at one end with communal value being increased and at the other end with civic value being furthered. Digital technology has allowed human generosity and "the world's free time and talents," which Shirky calls cognitive surplus, to combine and create a new form of creative expression. This creative expression can take the form of lolcats or endeavors such as Ushahidi; the former Shirky says increases communal value, "it is created by the participants for each other" for simple amusement, whereas the latter he cites furthers civic value meaning the group action is taken to benefit society as a whole.

Shirky then presents the view that society lives under social constraint and that these social constraints can create a culture that is "more generous than" the environment created by contractual constraints alone. Understanding where the economic or contractual motivation of a situation ends and where the social part begins, Shirky claims is key when designing to maximize generosity. This being the case, to have society use its "trillion hours a year of participatory value" to advance civic value, society itself simply needs to prize, and collectively praise, endeavors like Ushahidi.

Clay Shirky wrote an essay about the aspects of online community building through broadcast media. As members of a broad social community and users of media outlets, Shirky suggests ways in which we can build up this type of society.

Shirky suggests five different things to think about when dealing with broadcast media outlets: Audiences are built. Communities grow. Communities face a tradeoff between size and focus. Participation matters more than quality. You may own the software, but the community owns itself. The community will want to build. Help it, or at least let it.

=== Response to Evgeny Morozov on consulting for the Libyan government ===
In March 2011, Shirky responded to questions raised by Evgeny Morozov about consulting he had done for the Libyan government. Morozov tweeted "With Clay Shirky consulting the Libyan govt, it's now clear why dictators are so smart about the Web". Shirky explained he had been invited in 2007 to speak in Boston to Libya's IT Minister. Shirky stated the talk was "about using social software to improve citizen engagement in coastal towns. The idea was that those cities would be more economically successful if local policies related to the tourist trade were designed by the locals themselves." Shirky added that nothing came of the project beyond his initial talk. He defended his underlying desire to expand representative government in Libya and concluded that "the best reason to believe that social media can aid citizens in their struggle to make government more responsive is that both citizens and governments believe that."

=== Reaction to SOPA ===
In January 2012, at TED Salon NY, Shirky gave a talk titled "Why SOPA is a bad idea." He cites SOPA as a way for traditional, mass media producers to "raise the cost of copyright compliance to the point where people simply get out of the business of offering it as a capability to amateurs." After an offending internet site is identified, with the identification process itself not specified in the bill, the targeted site will be removed from the Domain Name System (DNS). Shirky claims since you can still use the static IP address of the site in question, removal from DNS is futile. He identifies the Audio Home Recording Act of 1992 as a law that was able to delineate between sharing with your friends as being legal and selling for commercial gain as illegal. Unsatisfied, media companies, Shirky claims, continued to push government to create more sweeping legislation which would hinder any form of sharing. This pressure, in 1998, created the Digital Millennium Copyright Act. It was now legal for media companies to sell uncopyable material although uncopyable digital material does not exist. To remedy this fact, Shirky states that media companies now tried to break consumer's computer hardware to create the illusion that the media they purchased was indeed uncopyable.

The DMCA marks the moment when the media industries gave up on the legal system of distinguishing between legal and illegal copying and simply tried to prevent copying through technical means.

Whereas DMCA was "surgical," SOPA is "nuclear" since the law stipulates any sites pointing to "illegal" content may be censored. Ultimately, Shirky points out the public-at-large is by far the largest producers of content and they are the ones which will be censured. They will be presumed guilty until they can prove the content they published is not illegal. This turns the American legal system on its head. He closes by encouraging Americans to contact their senators and congressmen and reminding them they prefer "not to be treated like a thief."

=== Distributed version control and democracy ===
On June 29, 2012, Shirky participated in Session 12: Public Sphere of TEDGlobal 2012. Shirky made the observation that many of the technological advancements in communication throughout history, from the printing press to the television, were heralded as harbingers of world peace yet ended up creating greater dissent. "The more ideas there are in circulation, the more ideas there are for any individual to disagree with." However, Shirky claims, with this increased "arguing," comes an increased "speed" of information exchange. Shirky cites "The Invisible College" as an example of a group that was able to utilize this effect created by the printing press, via the scientific journal, to help launch the Scientific Revolution.

He then states we are in a similar period today with open-source programmers and their use of distributed version control or DVCS. DVCS, he argues, allows for "more arguments" to be made into "better arguments". DVCS also allows for "cooperation without coordination" which Shirky states is "the big change". He then suggests that DVCS fits naturally with law as it, and software development, are "dependency-related." Shirky presents another application for DVCS – drafting legislation. He cites Open Legislation, a listing of legislative information from the New York State Senate and Assembly, as an early step in that direction.

The talk culminates with Shirky posing the open question of whether or not government will transition from striving towards one-way transparency to mutual collaboration and suggests if it does, there is already a "new form of arguing" centered around DVCS to aid the transition.

== Bibliography ==
- The Internet by E-Mail (1994) – ISBN 1-56276-240-0
- Voices from the Net (1995) – ISBN 1-56276-303-2
- P2P Networking Overview (2001) – ISBN 0-596-00185-1
- Shirky, Clay (2003). "Power Laws, Weblogs, and Inequality". Writings About the Internet. Archived from the original on 8 February 2006.
- Planning for Web Services: Obstacles and Opportunities (2003) – ISBN 0-596-00364-1
- Selected Articles in The Best Software Writing I, Joel Spolsky ed. (2005) – ISBN 1-59059-500-9
  - "A Group is its Own Worst Enemy" by Clay Shirky
  - "Group as User: Flaming and the Design of Social Software" by Clay Shirky
- Here Comes Everybody: The Power of Organizing Without Organizations (2008) – ISBN 978-1-59420-153-0
- Cognitive Surplus: Creativity and Generosity in a Connected Age (2010) – ISBN 978-1-59420-253-7
- Little Rice: Smartphones, Xiaomi, and the Chinese Dream (2015) – ISBN 978-0-9909763-2-5

== See also ==
- Networked advocacy
