= Yochai Benkler =

Israeli-American technology law expert, political economist, and author

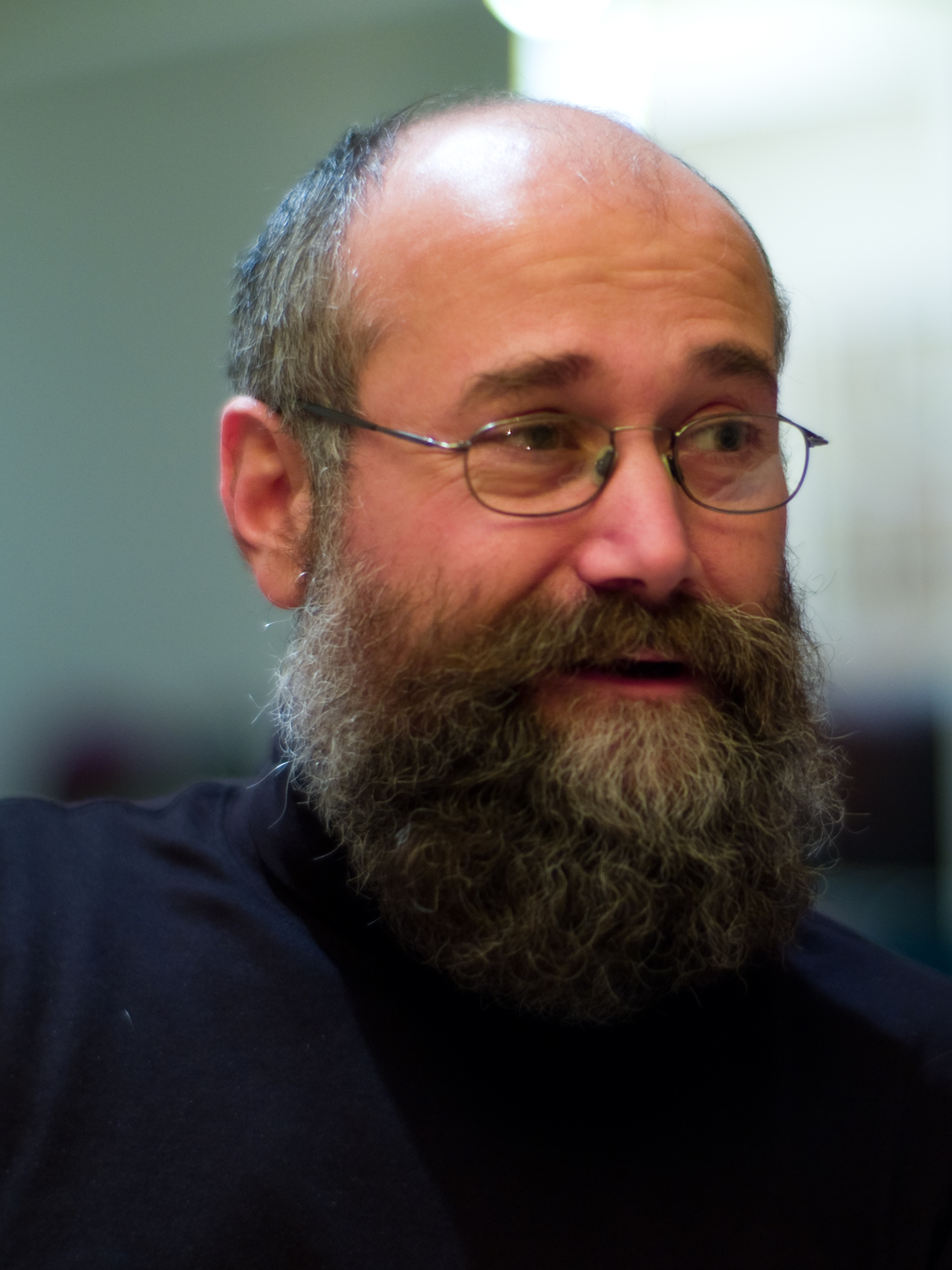
- Benkler in 2006
- Born: 1964 (age 61–62); Givatayim, Israel
- Education: Tel-Aviv University (LLB); Harvard University (JD)
- Spouse: Deborah Schrag
- Children: 2
- Scientific career
- Fields: Information technology law Industrial information economy
- Workplaces: Harvard Law School; Berkman Klein Center for Internet & Society
- Website: benkler.org

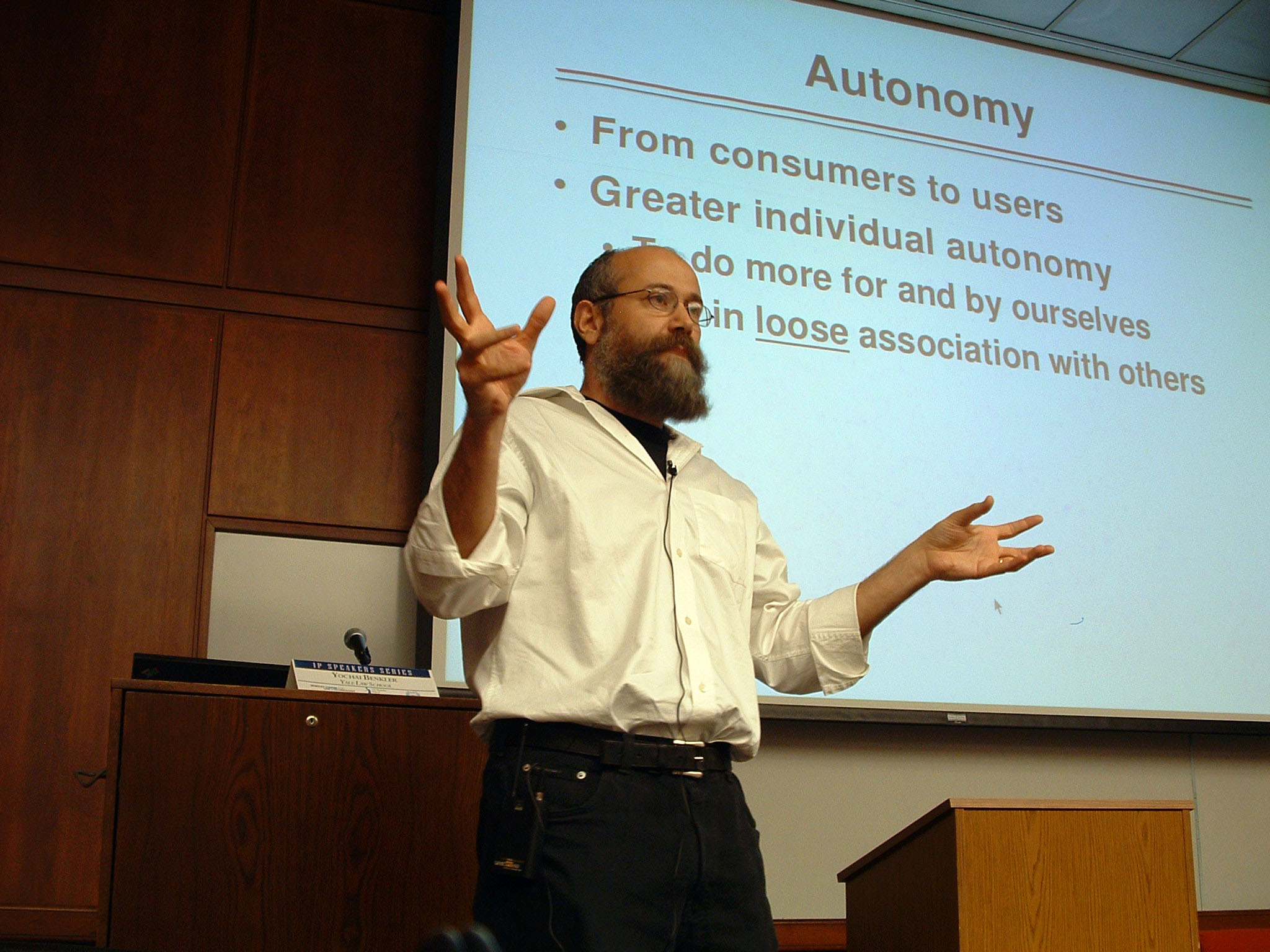
Yochai Benkler speaking at UC Berkeley School of law in 2006

Yochai Benkler (/ˈjoʊxaɪ/ YO-khai; born 1964) is an Israeli-American author and the Berkman Professor of Entrepreneurial Legal Studies at Harvard Law School. He is also a faculty co-director of the Berkman Klein Center for Internet & Society at Harvard University. In academia he is best known for coining the term commons-based peer production and his widely cited 2006 book The Wealth of Networks.

== Biography ==
From 1984 to 1987, Benkler was a member and treasurer of the Kibbutz Shizafon. He received his LL.B. from Tel-Aviv University in 1991 and J.D. from Harvard Law School in 1994. He worked at the law firm Ropes & Gray from 1994 to 1995. He clerked for U.S. Supreme Court Justice Stephen G. Breyer from 1995 to 1996.

He was a professor at New York University School of Law from 1996 to 2003, and visited at Yale Law School and Harvard Law School (during 2002–2003), before joining the Yale Law School faculty in 2003. In 2007, Benkler joined Harvard Law School, where he teaches and is a faculty co-director of the Berkman Klein Center for Internet & Society. Benkler is on the advisory board of the Sunlight Foundation. In 2011, his research led him to receive the $100,000 Ford Foundation Social Change Visionaries Award. He is also one of the 25 leading figures on the Information and Democracy Commission launched by Reporters Without Borders.

== Works ==
Benkler's research focuses on commons-based approaches to managing resources in networked environments. He coined the term commons-based peer production to describe collaborative efforts based on sharing information, such as free and open source software and Wikipedia. He also uses the term 'networked information economy' to describe a "system of production, distribution, and consumption of information goods characterized by decentralized individual action carried out through widely distributed, nonmarket means that do not depend on market strategies."

=== The Wealth of Networks ===
Benkler's 2006 book The Wealth of Networks examines the ways in which information technology permits extensive forms of collaboration that have potentially transformative consequences for economy and society. Wikipedia, Creative Commons, Open Source Software and the blogosphere are among the examples that Benkler draws upon. (The Wealth of Networks is itself published under a Creative Commons license.) For example, Benkler argues that blogs and other modes of participatory communication can lead to "a more critical and self-reflective culture", where citizens are empowered by the ability to publicize their own opinions on a range of issues, which enables them to move from passive recipients of "received wisdom" to active participants. Much of The Wealth of Networks is presented in economic terms, and Benkler raises the possibility that a culture in which information is shared freely could prove more economically efficient than one in which innovation is encumbered by patent or copyright law, since the marginal cost of re-producing most information is effectively nothing.

=== Network Propaganda ===
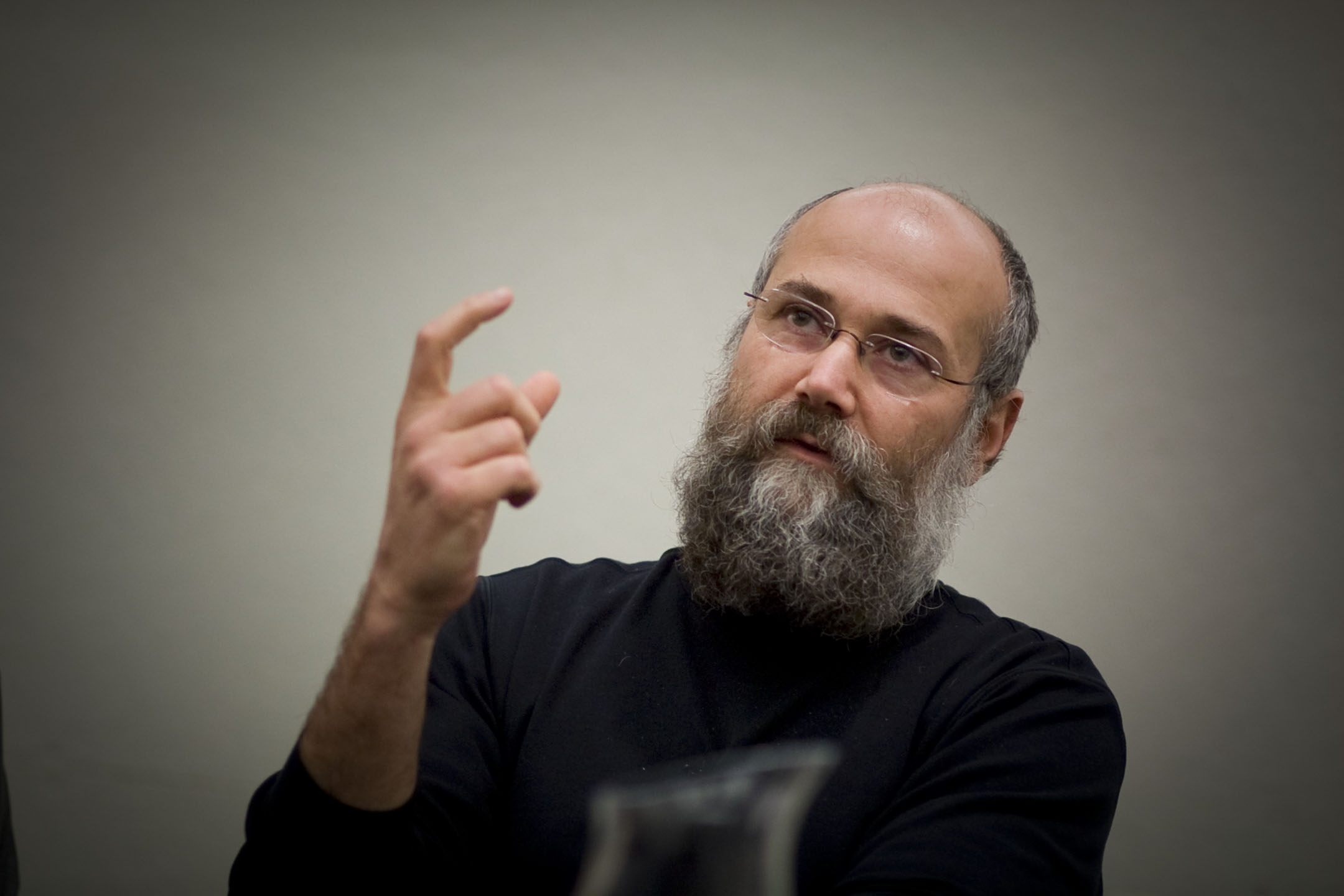
Benkler in 2009

Along with Robert Faris, Research Director of the Berkman Klein Center for Internet and Society at Harvard University, and Hal Roberts, a Fellow at the Berkman Klein Center for Internet & Society at Harvard University, Benkler co-authored the October 2018 Network Propaganda: Manipulation, Disinformation and Radicalization in American Politics.

In 2011, Benkler published The Penguin and the Leviathan: How Cooperation Triumphs over Self-Interest.

== Awards ==
- 2006 – Donald McGannon Award for Social and Ethical Relevance in Communications Policy Research
- 2006 – Public Knowledge IP3 Award
- 2007 – EFF Pioneer Award
- 2008 – The American Sociological Association Section on Communication and Information Technologies (CITASA) Book Award
- 2009 – Don K. Price Award
- 2011 – Ford Foundation Visionaries Award

== See also ==
- List of law clerks for the second seat of the Supreme Court of the United States
- Industrial information economy
- Carr–Benkler wager
