= Open-source economics =

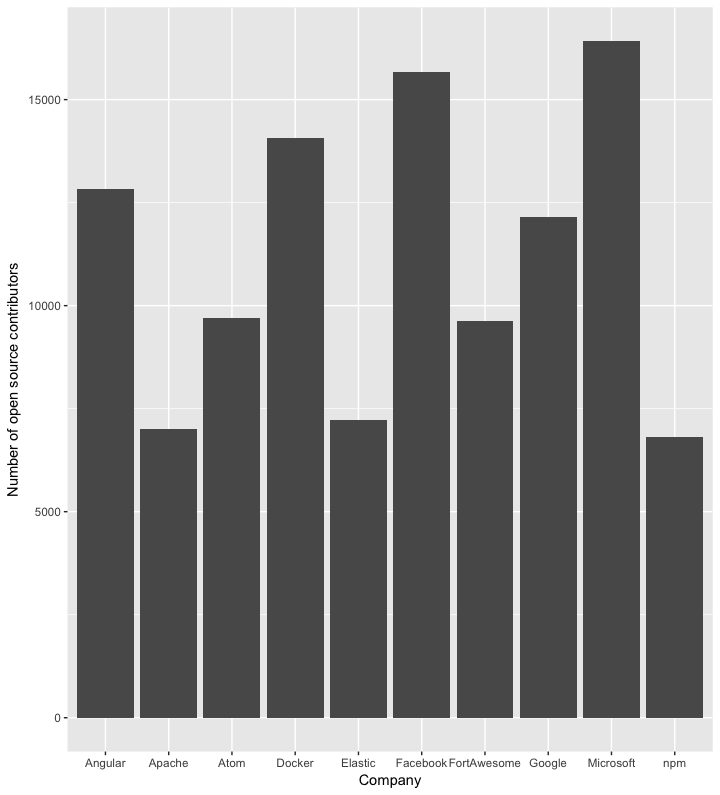
The ten companies with the most open-source contributors

Technical report on open-source economics in Europe

Open-source economics is an economic platform based on open collaboration for the production of software, services, or other products.

First applied to the open-source software industry, this economic model may be applied to a wide range of enterprises.

Some characteristics of open-source economics may include: work or investment carried out without express expectation of return; products or services produced through collaboration between users and developers; and no direct individual ownership of the enterprise itself.

As of recently there were no known commercial organizations outside of software that employ open-source economics as a structural base. Today there are organizations that provide services and products, or at least instructions for building such services or products, that use an open-source economic model.

The structure of open-source is based on user participation. "Networked environment makes possible a new modality of organizing production: radically decentralized, collaborative, and non-proprietary; based on sharing resources and outputs among widely distributed, loosely connected individuals who cooperate with each other without relying on either market signals or managerial commands."

== Incentives ==
=== Individual incentives ===
While initially it might seem that contributing to open-source software goes against basic economic principles, there are several ways in which people are incentivized to contribute to open-source projects. Some reasons are not strictly economically beneficial to the contributor, but are related to leisure activities. People program as a hobby and are incentivized to contribute to open-source projects simply because they enjoy it. There are also altruistic reasons, such as creating a better world and donating one's time to a project one believes in.

There are also several economic arguments for producing open-source software. A potential economic benefit is the enhancement of a person's reputation or resume. A top contributor to open-source software may get easier access to venture capital money or better access to jobs. Further, developing open-source software can be cheaper than purchasing commercial software, thereby saving a contributor money.

=== Corporate incentives ===
Corporations have several incentives to contribute to open-source projects, including talent acquisition. Some software developers are huge proponents of open-source software, and if they have used a company's open-source software, or are aware of it, they may be more interested in working for that company. For example, Twitter created Bootstrap, an easy-to-use framework for designing websites. Bootstrap is very popular and is used by many people. Therefore, by open-sourcing Bootstrap, Twitter is able to increase brand awareness due to the large number of people developing products with their software, which should help them attract talent.

For many businesses, the decision on what parts to release as open source is an exercise in weighing factors against each other. A common way of doing this is releasing the tools and infrastructures that support the product, but keeping the product itself proprietary. This way, they can benefit from enhanced reputation and the recruitment of talented engineers without giving up their competitive edge.

By making a product open-source, more people can contribute. These contributions can help develop the software faster, so it may also be beneficial for companies to open-source to get free help.

== Effect on corporations ==
=== Monopolies ===
Open-source software can help protect against monopolies. For example, the rise of Linux, an open-source computer operating system, helped prevent Microsoft from being considered a monopolist. Microsoft considered Linux to be their main competitor during the 1990s. Many computer makers offer Linux or Windows for their users, and a large percentage of mobile phone and tablet operating systems are Android, which is a Linux variant. Not only are monopolies affected, but several other businesses with strongholds are affected. Microsoft Office has open-source competitors such as LibreOffice.

=== Open-source for-profit businesses ===
Numerous companies have created businesses around open-source software. They do this by publishing all of their code open-source, then charging for training, certifications, add-ons, and other services. One example is Red Hat, which produces operating systems. Red Hat sells services such as 24/7 support, integration into company's products, and training. Red Hat was the pioneer for the open source business model, and was valued at approximately $16 billion as of April 2017. Other examples include Google, which created Android, an open-source mobile operating system based on Linux.

== See also ==
- Free and open-source software
- Business models for open-source software
- Free hardware
- Open Source Ecology
- Commercial use of copyleft works
- Commons-based peer production
