= Dealsplus =

DealsPlus
- Website type: Social Commerce
- Available in: English
- Website: www.dealsplus.com
- Registration: Optional
- Users: 6,000,000
- Launched: 18 July 2006; 20 years ago
- Current status: Active

DealsPlus is an online coupon and deal social commerce website. It combines aspects of an online coupon site and user-generated content driven deal focused sites. Like other coupon and deals sites, SEO plays an important role in DealsPlus’ business. Based on an SEO analysis, Priceonomics ranked DealsPlus third behind RetailMeNot and Coupons.com for a sample of key word terms.

== Overview ==
DealsPlus sources deal and coupon content from its community of users as well as from a group of power users called Money Makers. DealsPlus’ Money Makers can earn a guaranteed minimum of $300 per month for submitting coupons and deals and can earn substantially more depending on the performance of the deals and coupons they submit. The website is currently shut down.

== History ==
DealsPlus was founded in 2006 as a social deal and coupon site. DealsPlus attempted to acquire the domain dealsplus.com in 2010 through a UDRP action but a three-judge panel rejected the UDRP claim. In early 2013, DealsPlus acquired Dealsplus.com for an unknown sum and changed some of its branding and design to reflect ownership of the new URL. As of 2025, the website has shut down.
