= Carr–Benkler wager =

The Carr–Benkler wager between Yochai Benkler and Nicholas Carr concerned the question whether the most influential sites on the Internet will be peer-produced or price-incentivized systems.

== History ==
The wager was proposed by Benkler in July 2006 in a comment to a blog post where Carr criticized Benkler's views about volunteer peer-production. Benkler believed that by 2011 the major sites would have content provided by volunteers in what Benkler calls commons-based peer production, as in Wikipedia, Reddit, Flickr and YouTube. Carr argued that the trend would favor content provided by paid workers, as in most traditional news outlets.

In May 2012 Carr resurrected the discussion, arguing that he had clearly won the wager, pointing out that the most popular blogs and online videos at that time were corporate productions. Benkler replied with a rebuttal shortly after, arguing that the only way Carr could be seen to have won is if social software was considered as commercial content. Gigaom writer Matthew Ingram stated at the time that "Benkler has clearly won. While there are large corporate entities with profit-oriented motives involved in the web, a group that includes Facebook and Twitter, the bulk of the value that is produced in those networks and services comes from the free behavior of crowds of users."

A 2021 academic paper revisited the wager, concluding: "So, who has won the bet? Black or white questions like this reduce the possible answers to only two. However, the reality, as is often the case, is more complex. [...U]npaid labor co-exists with paid labor, profit-maximization co-exists with commoning, and the homo economicus co-exists with the homo socialis. In 2006, Carr and Benkler had agreed that a dinner would be paid by the one who would lose the wager [...]. Hence, it seems that Carr should pay the main course while Benkler should pay the dessert."

== Analysis ==
The early exchange of arguments from the two sides shows the crevasse between two opposing realities: Carr looks at the market-oriented outcome of a, at the time, nascent digital economy, while Benkler looks at the peer-based process, on which the market capitalizes. There are many layers where this tension can be observed. First, there is a subtle difference between peer production and commons-based peer production (CBPP). On one hand, for-profit initiatives, such as Facebook or Google, utilize peer production practices to maximize shareholder value. On the other hand, commons-oriented initiatives, such as Wikipedia or FOSS projects, utilize such practices to maximize sharing and commons creation.

Second, although websites are run by commercial companies, a considerable part of their technological infrastructure, as well as software used by Fortune 500 companies and governments, is based on CBPP: from Apache, a web server, to Linux, on which top-500 supercomputers run, to WordPress, a content management system, to OpenSSL, an encryption protocol used to secure transactions.

Finally, CBPP draws from a diverse set of motivations. Contributors participate to gain knowledge, to produce something useful for them, to build their social capital, to communicate and have a sense of belonging, but also to get financial rewards. So, the price-incentivized production does exist in CBPP but it is relegated to being a peripheral concept only. Moreover, public infrastructure and institutions make the digital economy possible to begin with, by regulating the conditions under which service providers can offer services, information is transmitted and users get access to it. It is only after all the above are in place that competition and price-incentives can actually function. Hence, the dominance of one modality over the other is not an outcome of “natural selection,” rather a result of political definition. The state steers competition and profit-motives, implicitly rationalizing the produced economic outcomes, in the way they are measured in business and national accounts. Likewise, the state could use similar leverages to enable and support the direct creation of public purpose value by the civil society and commons-based enterprises.

== See also ==
- Cargo cult
- Gift economy
- The Wealth of Networks
