= Here Comes Everybody (book) =

2008 book by Clay Shirky

Here Comes Everybody: The Power of Organizing Without Organizations
- Author: Clay Shirky
- Language: English
- Genre: Non-fiction
- Publisher: Penguin Group
- Publication date: February 28, 2008
- Media type: Print (Hardback)
- Pages: 327 pp
- ISBN: 978-1-59420-153-0
- OCLC: 168716646
- Dewey Decimal: 303.48/33 22
- LC Class: HM851 .S5465 2008

Here Comes Everybody: The Power of Organizing Without Organizations is a book by Clay Shirky published by Penguin Press in 2008 on the effect of the Internet on modern group dynamics and organization. The author considers examples such as Wikipedia, MySpace, and other social media in his analysis. According to Shirky, the book is about "what happens when people are given the tools to do things together, without needing traditional organizational structures". The title of the work alludes to HCE, a recurring and central figure in James Joyce's Finnegans Wake and considers the impacts of self-organizing movements on culture, politics, and business.

== Synopsis ==
In the book, Shirky recounts how social tools, such as blogging software like WordPress and Twitter, file sharing platforms like Flickr, and online collaboration platforms like Wikipedia, support group conversation and group action in a way that could previously only be achieved through institutions. Shirky argues that with the advent of online social tools, groups can form without previous restrictions of time and cost, in the same way the printing press increased individual expression, and the telephone increased communications between individuals. Shirky observes that:

[Every] institution lives in a kind of contradiction: it exists to take advantage of group effort, but some of its resources are drained away by directing that effort. Call this the institutional dilemma--because an institution expends resources to manage resources, there is a gap between what those institutions are capable of in theory and in practice, and the larger the institution, the greater those costs.

Online social tools, Shirky argues, allow groups to form around activities 'whose costs are higher than the potential value,' for institutions. Shirky further argues that the successful creation of online groups relies on successful fusion of a, 'plausible promise, an effective tool, and an acceptable bargain for the user.' However, Shirky warns that this system should not be interpreted as a recipe for the successful use of social tools as the interaction between the components is too complex.

Shirky also discusses the possibility of mass amateurization that the internet allows. With blogging and photo-sharing websites, anyone can publish an article or photo that they have created. This creates a mass amateurization of journalism and photography, requiring a new definition of what credentials make someone a journalist, photographer, or news reporter. This mass amateurization threatens to change the way news is spread throughout different media outlets.

However, after publication, in an interview with Journalism.co.uk, Clay Shirky revised some of his own work by saying that "democratic legitimation is itself enough to regard aggregate public opinion as being clearly binding on the government." Shirky uses the example of the prioritization of a campaign to legalize medical marijuana on Change.gov, stating that while it was a 'net positive,' for democracy, it was not an absolute positive. He concedes that public pressure via the Internet could be another implementation method for special interest groups.

== Key concepts ==
=== Coasean Ceiling/Coasean Floor ===
In Chapter Two, "Sharing Anchors Community", the author uses theories from the 1937 paper The Nature of the Firm by Nobel Prize–winning economist Ronald Coase which introduces the concept of transaction costs to explain the nature and limits of firms. From these theories, Shirky derives two terms that represent the constraints under which these traditional institutions operate: Coasean Ceiling and Coasean Floor.

Coasean Ceiling
institutions which grow too large hit the ceiling and become so unwieldy that the transaction costs of managing a standard institutional form prevent it from working well and it just breaks down.

Coasean Floor
The point below which there isn't enough profit from transactions for a particular type of activity to meet the overhead costs of setting up a traditional institution.

The author argues that social tools drastically reduce transaction costs and organizing overhead, allowing loosely structured groups with limited managerial oversight to operate under the Coasean Floor. As an example, he cites Flickr, which allows groups to organically form around themes of images without the transaction costs of managerial oversight.

=== Promise, Tool, Bargain ===
In Chapter Eleven, "Promise, Tool, Bargain", Shirky states that each success story of using social tools to form groups contained within the book is an example of the complex fusion of 'a plausible promise, an effective tool, and an acceptable bargain with the users.'

Promise: Why someone would join a group
The first challenge to creating an effective promise is that the claim on the users' time for a particular activity must be greater than the activity the users are already doing. A second challenge is that social tools be satisfying to the individual user. Shirky suggests three strategies for handling these challenges.

- Make joining the group easy
- Create personal value
- Subdivide the community

Tool: Overcoming challenges to coordination of the group
A social tool is only as good as the job it is meant for, and it must be a tool that the user actually wants to use. Here the author switches focus away from the types of tools to the types of groups (large and small) that the tools are designed to support. Small groups tend to be more tightly knit and conversational than large groups.

Bargain: What to expect and what is expected of someone who joins the group
The author argues that the bargain is the most complex characteristic of the successful forming of groups using social tools, because it is both less explicit than promise and tool, and it requires more input by the user.

Power Law Distribution: A predictable imbalance in the use and traffic of communications tools
Shirky says that "in systems where many people are free to choose between many options, a small subset of the whole will get a disproportionate amount of traffic (or attention, or income), even if no members of the system actively work towards such an outcome. This has nothing to do with moral weakness, selling out, or any other psychological explanation. The very act of choosing, spread widely enough and freely enough, creates a power law distribution." This explains, among other things, the dynamics (and ultimately the success) of tools like wikis where there is a disproportionate amount of participation by an extremely small percentage of the overall users, while the vast majority contribute little or nothing.

== Critical response ==
The Bookseller declared the book one of the two "most reviewed" books over the [2008] Easter weekend, noting that the Telegraph's reviewer Dibbell found it "as crisply argued and as enlightening a book about the Internet as has been written" and that the Guardian reviewer Stuart Jeffries called it "terrifically clever" and "harrowing".

In a 2009 review, NYTimes.com contributor Liesl Schillinger called the book "eloquent and accessible" and encouraged readers to buy the book, which had recently been released in paperback.

In the Times Higher Education, Tara Brabazon, professor of Media Studies at University of Brighton, criticizes Here Comes Everybody for excluding "older citizens, the poor, and the illiterate". Brabazon also argues that the "assumption that 'we' can learn about technology from technology - without attention to user-generated contexts rather than content - is the gaping, stunning silence of Shirky's argument".

== See also ==
- Adhocracy, informal organization
- Flash mob
