= Convergence culture =

Theory in media studies

Convergence culture is a theory which recognizes changing relationships and experiences with new media. Henry Jenkins is accepted by media academics to be the father of the term with his book Convergence Culture: Where Old and New Media Collide. It explores the flow of content distributed across various intersections of media, industries and audiences, presenting a back and forth power struggle over the distribution and control of content.

Convergence culture is grouped under the larger term of media convergence, however, it is not mutually exclusive to the other types of convergence such as technological or regulatory aspects. The cultural shift within convergence discourse focuses on how media production and consumption has changed with the relevance of participatory culture, collective intelligence and a converging technological environment. Users can now experience an extended, interactive and even shared engagement with not just entertainment media, but also informational media.

A converging technological environment involves the changes in technology that cause different technological systems to develop and perform similar tasks. Older media such as television and radio provided the single task of broadcasting while new media can perform multiple tasks. Smartphones are an example of new media and a convergent device that can be used for not only making phone calls and sending text messages but also used for surfing the internet, watching videos, paying bills, accessing social media, and so on. Social media platforms are forms of new media that create new models of social convergence. Platforms like Google have managed to expand their services to allow a single sign-on that connects a user's workplace to their entertainment system to create a converging technological environment.

However, as the notion became popular in various media discourses, some scholars see an over-use of the idea of convergence culture, reassessing its broad nature or lack of specificity.

== History ==
Even though convergence culture is grouped under the wider term of "media convergence," this idea emerged within the "convergence" discourse roughly around the 2000s. Some scholars view the progression of media convergence as a four-part historical and narratological model as a way to organize the wide and various uses of "convergence".

- From the 1980s, media convergence focused on technological aspects or a rise in the digitization of the media, where communication, information and electronic technology began to intersect. Media becoming a mediator of visuals, audio and text, all into one.
- From here to the early 1990s, theories of economic and market convergence became prominent, which highlighted a phase of merging of businesses and integration of industries.
- Subsequently, political and regulatory ways of thinking concerning the convergence of media arose during the 1990, as media online became a new subject of political and regulatory control.
- In the 2000s, a focus on "culture", increased the popularity around convergence. This included consumer preferences and participation of active audiences with the media. During this time, some scholars argue that this notion became over-used and taken for granted in its application to media and cultural studies.

== Aspects of convergence culture ==
=== Collective intelligence ===
This term "collective intelligence", introduced by Pierre Levy, refers to the ability of virtual communities to collaborate bits of their knowledge or expertise to make it a whole, essentially working together towards a shared goal.Collective intelligence is also distinguished from simply "shared knowledge" across a community, since not one single mind or group can possibly know everything, instead it becomes a sum of many minds half full. In a converged culture, according to Jenkins, "media consumption has become a collective process" where meaning-making is collaborated.

==== Survivor fans ====
In his book Convergence Culture, Jenkins uses the example of the Survivor fan culture to reveal this phenomenon at play. Here, fans on Reddit, described as a "knowledge community", work like a hive mind and come together online to put multiple pieces of relatively small bits of information together, thus being able to puzzle together spoilers. If someone was faced with a roadblock, or complication in their investigations, other users part of the Reddit thread would contribute with their own specific expertise by adding more of their findings, or even correcting previous information.These spoilers revealed secrets such as the next season's location, the finalists, eventual winner, and other exciting moments of the seasons.

For example, in the second season The Australian Outback, fans were able to figure out that a contestant was eliminated due to a medical evacuation, as well as who that person was. By finding a contestant's corporate website, they were able to view pictures of the contestant (Mike Skupin) post-season with a business associate and wearing an arm cast, which showed evidence of an arm injury. This prediction was confirmed when after episode 6 aired and Mike Skupin fell into the camp fire.

Other fans in their travels would be able to find where the next season's location is, before it is even revealed (the show would withhold the next season's location until it began its promos). By building on what others have contributed, a couple goes through a detailed process of satellite images, building a network of travel agencies and tourism directors, studying ecology and culture and asking locals for information.

This collective intelligence behind the reality TV show became so ingrained into the show's culture whereby the executive producer Mark Burnett would "play" with his audience, misdirecting their predictions, and switch up his editing style to throw them off from their assumptions. According to Jenkins, this spoiler culture behind Survivor revealed a new power-relationship between production and consumption with more interactive online behaviors because of the show's open recognition of the so-called "collective intelligence" . Watching the show became a shared experience of collaboration which extended their engagement with the media hence, some argue that not taking this into account can be a flaw in the producers, not fully accepting a new commodity.

=== Transmedia storytelling ===
This aspect of convergence culture refers more to the production of media, encompassing a change where industries and mediums of media have expanded and overlapped. Rather than simply sending out their media through one medium, whether it be a film or comic, it can extend to different cultural commodities, that individually present a self-sustaining addition to the story and therefore add depth to a consumer's experience. Jenkins describes transmedia storytelling to require consumers of media to actively participate, both being encouraged and encouraging media creators to create fiction that is no longer consumed in one manner, but through multiple mediums and platforms.

In the words of Jenkins, "Transmedia storytelling is the art of world making." A single story can now stretch across TV, film, video games and even social media. However what separates this from a franchise is that each medium ideally makes its own unique contribution to the progression of the story, it should be more than just a reiteration onto a new medium.

==== Matrix ====
A film such as the Matrix, is an example of a franchised cinema project, where auxiliary information extended outwards, outside of the film industry and into other means of cultural production. In the case of Matrix, its audience was expected to go out of their way into different media channels, such as online fan-community forums, to fully understand the mythology of the film and continue on the storytelling journey throughout the sequel franchise Matrix: Reloaded and Revolutions. Taking one of its multiple video games, such as Enter the Matrix, exemplifies these extensions as not just adaptations, but instead add to the story by almost "upstaging" a main character in the films (Morpheus) with a minor character who you play as in the game (Niobe) thus creating a new narrative perspective for fans who participated within the "world" more.

=== Participatory culture ===
Terms such as produsage and prosumption that describe the audience of participatory culture, refer to a shift from passive consumers to a more active audience within a new media environment. These terms recognize the ability of users on web 2.0 to generate their own amateur content which can span from personal social media content to fan fiction and to even forming a new genre of citizen journalism. Barriers to production are low, as technologies facilitate the ability to easily produce, share and consume content. For example, missing out on the current week's episode of one's favorite TV show would be a common problem, but internet technologies have enabled the practice of downloading and streaming an episode on demand. Also, creating fan videos are a more accessible type of fan engagement with the download of scenes, and using free pre-installed video editing software. Jenkins integrates this active audience participation as a notable element of convergence culture, whereby fans as consumers can directly interact with content and appropriate or remix it into their own consumption process.

Because of the more emerging participatory content, it represents the media industries to not simply be a top-down corporate driven process, but just as much a bottom-up, consumer driven process too. While companies are looking to extend their content across platforms and enter new realms, consumers in this converged ecology have also gained control in aspects of the process such as where, how and when they want to consume. For example, the creation of fan fiction, while it can sometimes be managed and facilitated by the corporate leaders, fans can take worlds and remix and collaborate it into something new and their own. It has reached a point where consumption now can entail some fragment of collaboration, creation etc.

Half-Life Counter Strike logo

An example of this flattened hierarchical structure between the production and consumption of content or media is Counter-Strike the computer game. This game originated as an extension of Half Life,a modification ("mod") and therefore not its own game. Creators Minh Lee and Jeff Cliff, developed and released this "mod" for free but the game required a Half-Life copy to work. Using the Software Developer's Kit of Half Life to access the game's -building tools, the creators coded and modeled the game, but its maps and character options, which would traditionally be assigned a team of developers by the company, were essentially decided by its gamers, through prepublications and discussions on its websites. In this way, converged culture reveals a challenge of who is in charge, collaborating with outside developers, fans and producers to develop the game.

== The challenge of convergence culture ==
As the idea of convergence culture became more apparent in media and cultural studies, other scholars such as Nick Couldry and James Hay, saw the notion to be over-used catch all term. They began to question convergence culture as a buzzword that has yet to be fully mapped, and demands specificity. Scholars Anders Fagerjord and Tanja Storsul believe that while it may be an appropriate term to describe the changing technologies, convergence should not be applied as a "catch-all term." Instead, they propose the use of adjectives when using the term in order to highlight the type of convergence, whether it be media, regulatory, network and so on. This is because convergence has come to mean many things in different contexts and if not specified, can result in unwanted complexity and meaninglessness. Critics like Ginette Verstraete, have also mentioned a need to acknowledge and discuss the converged culture discourse within the context of other social spaces such as politics and economics. Jenkins in response also agreed to this need for further discussion, proposing to explore it in a more nuanced framework.

Other challenges that may concern a converged culture, are the political aspect of politics involved, regarding issues of media concentration and regulation of social networking sites and the use of "free labour". As various media and technological industries begin to merge, traditional media policies regarding each platform are beginning to overlap and become irrelevant. Furthermore, there is the additional challenge of user-generated content that goes under the radar, not having "gatekeepers" manage everything. Therefore, it has become a global challenge to embrace this change and implement policies and control accordingly.

Another challenge faced by the media industry is how to deal with digital communication and information technologies. With the rapid development of convergence culture, media professionals, like reporters, are frightened or confused whether their current skills are needed in the future. It’s common for them to have fear and resistance to change. Meanwhile, in this converged environment, the competition between different media becomes fiercer. The news media has adopted a 24-hour news cycle over time to provide a constant flood of information. Reporters are expected to process more stories and add more work to keep up with the industry demand, which are overloaded without appropriate financial compensation.
