= Sequential Tart =

Online magazine

- Editrix-in-Chief: Sheena McNeil
- Former editors: S. L. Osborne; Marcia Allas; Katherine Keller
- Staff writers: Marcia Allas, Suzette Chan, Jennifer Contino, Kimberly DeVries, Leigh Dragoon, Lisa R. Jonté
- Photographer: Laura Martin, art director
- Categories: Comics, Popular culture
- Frequency: Weekly (from 2 July 2007)
- Founder: S. L. Osborne
- Founded: 1997; 29 years ago
- First issue: Sep/Oct 1998
- Country: United States
- Language: English
- Website: www.sequentialtart.com

Sequential Tart (ST) is an online magazine focused on comics and popular culture from a female perspective. It was created in the late 1990s to serve "as an advocacy group for female consumers frustrated by their historical neglect or patronizing treatment by the comics industry." The magazine's title is a play on the term "sequential art"; the webzine's writers are referred to as "Tarts."

== Overview ==
Historically, the webzine's logo topped this self-description:

sequential tart (si-kwen'shel tart) n. -- 1. a Web Zine about the comics industry published by an eclectic band of women; 2. a publication dedicated to providing exclusive interviews, in-depth articles and news, while working towards raising the awareness of women's influence in the comics industry and other realms.

Sequential Tart "combines interviews with comics creators, retailers, and industry leaders, reviews of current publications, and critical essays about gender and comics. It showcases industry practices that attract or repel women, spotlights the work of smaller presses that often fell through the cracks, and promotes books that reflect their readers' tastes and interests."

ST contributor Kimberly DeVries "argues that the group self-consciously rejects the negative stereotypes about female comics readers constructed by men in and around the comics industry but also the well-meaning but equally constraining stereotypes constructed by the first generation of feminist critics of comics."

A regular feature of the webzine was Culture Vultures. Traditionally, each new issue featured an illustration by a comics professional.

== Publication history ==
Sequential Tart started out as "mailing list of female comics pros and fans" run by S. L. Osborne. Osborne discussed the impetus for the creation of the webzine in its first official issue (Sept./Oct. 1998):

It all started with Wizard, I think. Wizard has online polls and contests on their ... site..., like 'What are the top ten comics pickup lines to use on girls?' ... We complained. We cajoled. Please make the questions fun for women to answer! No such luck. About the same time, we were having a discussion about the frustration we feel when dealing with other female fans. ... Women look at us funny when we say we love Preacher and Johnny the Homicidal Maniac. It's very frustrating. We felt alone, we felt unwanted — Then we thought, hey —maybe we aren't alone. ... Maybe there are more women online who dig 'boys' comics'. Maybe other women get tired of seeing big-breasted bad girls every time they walk into a comics shop. Maybe they don't want to be told they should or shouldn't like ... horror or superhero, science fiction or fantasy. Maybe they want to make their own decisions, based on their own tastes instead of some preconceived notion. Maybe we could do something to make them feel that they aren't alone. Thus Sequential Tart was born.

ST started out bimonthly, but with its third issue, released in January 1999, it moved to monthly publication. In July 2007, the webzine became a weekly publication.

For a number of years, cartoonist Pam Bliss wrote "a series of essays about making minicomics for Sequential Tart entitled Hopelessly Lost, But Making Good Time." She collected those essays into a publication of the same title in 2002.

In 2008, ST editor Katherine Keller served as a judge for the Glyph Comics Awards.

Sequential Tart's August 2010 issue focused on Wonder Woman, with a "Tart Symposium on Wonder Woman's costume, a look at all of Wonder Woman's toys, and ... Visions of Wonder Woman, where the women talk about how they view Wonder Woman as a comic character and in pop culture. She's not always as popular among women as you might think."

== Columns ==
- 13 Questions — interviews with comics industry figures
- All Access – profiles and reviews of family-friendly comics
- Bizarre Breasts – highlighting the distortion of the female form in mainstream comics
- Dear Kady Mae — advice column
- Declaration of Independents – profiles of alternative comics and creators
- Going Postal — letters from readers
- Read This Or Die – "highlight ... comics that have impressed us and that we believe are deserving of a wider audience"
- Redirected Male – Profiles of male comics industry figures who meet the approval of Sequential Tart
- Retailer's Corner – focus on the distribution and retailing end of the industry
- Tart of the Month — profiles of an ST contributor
- Tart To Heart – "a question to the Tarts as a whole"

== Impact and reception ==
Wired magazine writer Corrina Lawson called Sequential Tart "one the best websites I know for comics commentary."

In his book Demanding Respect: The Evolution of the American Comic Book (Temple University Press, 2009), author Paul Lopes called Sequential Tart "one of the more popular comics web fanzines," and credited it for promoting "greater awareness of women artists and readers in comic book culture" while "maintaining general coverage of comic book culture."

Media scholar Henry Jenkins, in his book Convergence Culture (New York University Press, 2008), wrote that:

...the Sequential Tarts are increasingly courted by publishers or individual artists who feel they have content that female readers might embrace and have helped to make the mainstream publishers more attentive to this often underserved market. The Sequential Tarts represent a new kind of consumer advocacy group — one that seeks to diversify content and make mass media more responsive to its consumers.

== Awards ==
- 1998 Crafty.com "Cool Site of the Week"
- 1998 Planet Amazon's Bouquet of Roses Award
- 2000 Eagle Award for "Favourite Fan-organized Comic Related Website"
- 2000 About.com's Comic Book subsection's "Best of the Net"
- 2002 Friends of Lulu "Lulu of the Year"
- 2003 (nomination) Eagle Award for "Favourite Comics E-Zine"
- 2003 (nomination) National Comics Award for "Best Specialist Magazine or Website"
- 2005 (nomination) Eagle Award for "Favourite Comics E-Zine"

== See also ==
- Geek girl
- Friends of Lulu
- Black Girl Nerds
- GeekMom
