= Spreadability =

Mass media characteristic

In media studies and marketing, spreadability is the wide distribution and circulation of information on media platforms.

Spreadability contrasts with the "stickiness" of aggregating media in centralized places. The original copy of the (textual, visual, audio) information does not need to be replicated perfectly in order to display the characteristics of spreadability, rather the original can be manipulated or maintained in its original form and still be a product of this process. Simply, this concept refers to the capability of media being spread.

== Background ==
The first book which disseminated the concept of "spreadability" for media studies and marketing was Spreadable Media (2013) by media academics and industry experts Henry Jenkins, Sam Ford, and Joshua Green. This spreadability concept emerged in the development of a 2008 white paper, "If It Doesn't Spread, It's Dead: Creating Value in a Spreadable Marketplace" authored by Jenkins, Xiaochang Li, and Ana Domb Krauskopf, with assistance from Green.

The concept "refers to the potential – both technical and cultural – for audiences to share content for their own purposes, sometimes with the permission of rights holders, sometimes against their wishes". It is contextualised in the media landscape due to the strong connection with quick and easy sharing practices which have been enabled by media platforms. After Jenkins coined this term (in a rather optimistic context) many authors such as Christian Fuchs have interpreted this movement through a more pessimistic lens.

Spreadability is directly linked to "participatory culture" (a concept coined by Jenkins). Participatory culture is the backbone of spreadability as it depicts an image of people who are "shaping, sharing, reframing, and remixing media content". This culture is based on grass-root audience practices online. In other words, any user of a platform (that provides sharing possibilities) is emancipated as an individual who can informally, and instantaneously share information online. It is also important how the participatory culture and the act of sharing online "tends to be a communal act of giving and taking that links us to other people".

== Prerequisites ==
Jenkins situates spreadability in a particular context. This concept is particularly contextualised in the social media era and the Web 2.0 culture. These two transformations can be considered prerequisites for the idea of spreadability to exist and for spreadable media to adopt such mechanisms to achieve spreadability.

This new culture began at the beginning of the second millennium when the internet became an interactive space. This means there was a need for a platform or platforms where users could contribute and share information. Belk says this is how the "Internet and especially Web 2.0 has brought about many new ways of sharing as well as facilitating older forms of sharing on a large-scale".

There is a strong emphasis on content production, but more concretely, user-generated content production. This is where the importance of social media (an effect of the Web 2.0) is relevant. Spreadable media is only possible when there is a platform where the content can be shared. As Jenkins puts it, "spreadability emphasizes producing content in easy-to-share formats […] which makes it easier to spread videos [or any other material] across the Internet, and encouraging access points to that content in a variety of places". Furthermore, as a result of this sharing community, the public has become more individually and collectively literate about social platforms and their ability to construct identities online.

Therefore, there are a handful of prerequisites that allow media to become spreadable, including, the Internet enabling power to the user, platforms incorporating share buttons or other means to easily pass on media to a specific audience, and for the public to have the required intelligence to carry out these actions. Moreover, there are also specific characteristics which allow certain platforms to have spreadable media on them.

== Key attributes ==
There are special characteristics that help to define what spreadability actually is. One key movement that underlines all the other characteristics is the change from distribution to circulation. This means there is a community where individuals exchange 'meaningful bytes'.

Below is a table that describes how certain elements provided on a media platform engage the audience or viewer into becoming involved in the spreadability of information. The descriptions have been extracted from Jenkins, Ford & Green 2013.

Characteristic	Description
Open-ended Participation	This means that users can use existing material in unlimited and unpredictable ways
Collaboration Across Roles	There can be a blurring of lines between producer, marketer and audience because everyone can contribute
Motivating and Facilitating Sharing	The audience generates interest in different brands/franchises because of their sharing practices
Flow of Ideas	The individuals participating are not as important as their connections which are made visible through social media
Diversified Experiences	Sharing information may be for personal reasons that change the meaning of the original copy for different people

== Consequences ==
One major aspect of sharing media is the loss of control of ownership. It is no longer a black and white picture where one rule can determine this distinction. Hemetsberger expands on this issue in her chapter "Let The Source Be With You". She says how when one engages in sharing information with others, they give up their ownership. She says it is "access over ownership". This is contextualised in a positive environment where individuals can profit from the resources others can provide and are not obligated to be self-dependent. For example, carsharing illustrates how the practice of sharing can be communal act of giving and taking that does not explicitly require ownership. Another example is how one may upload a picture onto social media such as Facebook and by doing so, Facebook archives this information. What Facebook, or any other media platform does with this information which the user provides is sometimes not transparent although we agree to the terms and conditions that explain this.

Sharing can therefore save time and money for individuals who profit from these practices. Profit in general has monetary connotations attached to it but in this context it does not need to refer to an exchange of money. This also connects to the type of sharing that is used. Hemetsberger names three types of sharing; sharing in, sharing out and cross-sharing. It is especially through sharing in that leads to a feeling of belonging to a group or community. For example, when we share a cake between several people, there is a bond forming between those involved. "It is not the only way in which we connect with others, but it is a potential powerful one that creates feelings of solidarity and bonding" that partaking in such practices creates.

Although Hemetsberger speaks of ownership, Christian Fuchs takes a more negative stance on the subject in relation to sharing practices. He relates Wikipedia to the idea of communism and participatory democracy. He argues that "Wikipedians are prototypical contemporary communists" where those contributing to, as well as those who use this platform are guilty. In other words, three contributing factors make those interacting with Wikipedia contemporary communists.

1. the subjective dimension of production;
2. the objective dimension of production;
3. the subject-object dimension of production.

== Mediums and How They're Spread ==
Spreadability is possible through the use of media. A “medium” is any tool that can be used by anybody to deliver various forms of media (any information, a picture, etc.) to an individual or a group of people at any given point in time. As one could infer from the name, a “medium,” is essentially between two things (e.g. a person listening to the radio in their car). Media content is produced, and/or ‘altered,’ and then circulated on the media platform(s). According to Karcher, the three main types of spreadable media are “from scratch (original), altered (changed in someway before being circulated), and ‘as-is’ (circulated before any alterations are made).” No matter the involvement/contribution an individual takes part in when it comes to spreadable media, every aspect is extremely valuable because every person involved works together either directly or indirectly.

== Contribution ==
Since the social media era began, spreadability has allowed internet users to share newly created content as well as remix and remaster other’s work to spread content across platforms. Henry Jenkins believes it is in massive media conglomerates’ economic interest “to move any successful media content from one delivery system to another in order to maximize profit and broaden market potential”. Jenkins says, “consumers are taking advantage of the new media technologies to respond to, remix and repurpose existing media content”. Spreadable media must be quotable and grabbable, as well as easily portable and shareable, thus allowing audiences to re-use and consume. In 2010, Jenkins argued that the news industry lacked a sense of spreadability held within the social media markets. Consequently, Fake news is vastly spread through online social media. In 2018, Miriam Metzger, a UC Santa Barbara communications researcher, said, “Fake news is perfect for spreadability: It’s going to be shocking, it’s going to be surprising, and it’s going to be playing on people’s emotions, and that’s a recipe for how to spread misinformation,”

== See also ==
- Digital media
- Internet meme
- New media
- Social media

== Literature ==
- Fuchs, Christian (2014), Social Media : A Critical Introduction, London: Sage, ISBN 978-1-4462-5731-9
- Hemetsberger, Andrea (2012), "'Let the Source be with you!' –Practices of Sharing in Free and Open-Source Communities.", in Sützl, Wolfgang; Stadler, Felix; Maier, Roland; Hug, Theo (eds.), Media, Knowledge And Education: Cultures And Ethics Of Sharing/ Medien – Wissen – Bildung: Kulturen Und Ethiken Des Teilens., Innsbruck: Innsbruck University Press, ISBN 978-3-902811-74-5
- Jenkins, Henry; Ford, Sam; Green, Joshua (2013), Spreadable Media: Creating Meaning and Value in a Networked Culture, New York: New York University Press, ISBN 978-0-814743-50-8
- "Chapter 1: Introducing Critical Media Studies." Critical Media Studies: an Introduction, by Brian L. Ott and Robert L. Mack, Wiley-Blackwell, 2014, pp. 1–20.
