= Produsage =

User-led content creation that takes place in a variety of online environments

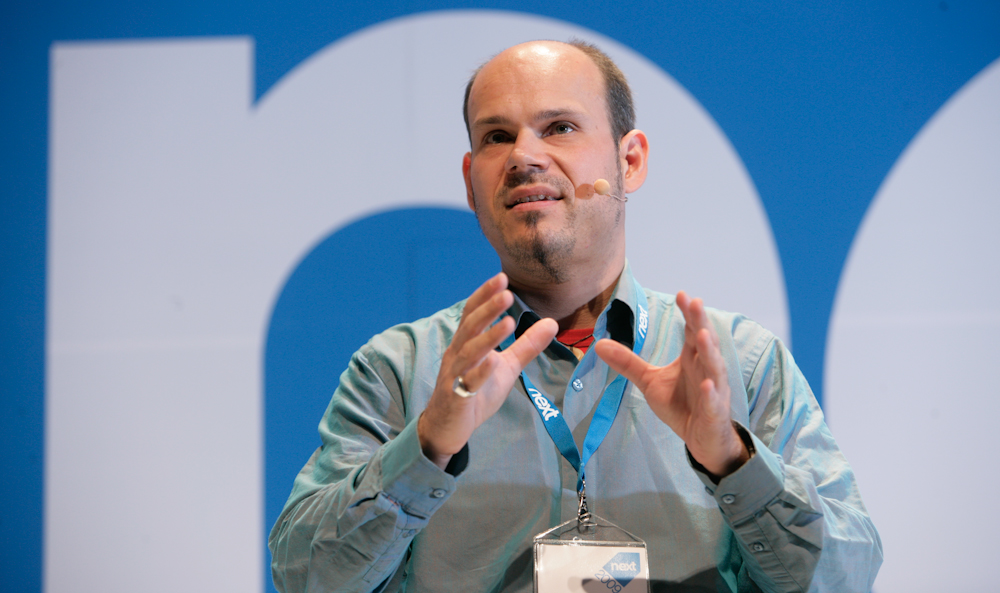
Axel Bruns, credited with coining the term "produsage"

Produsage is a portmanteau of the words production and usage, coined by German-Australian media scholar Axel Bruns and popularized in his book Blogs, Wikipedia, Second Life and Beyond: From Production to Produsage. Produsage is the type of user-led content creation that takes place in a variety of online environments, open source software, and the blogosphere. The concept blurs the boundaries between passive consumption and active production. The distinction between producers and consumers or users of content has faded, as users play the role of producers whether they are aware of this role or not. The hybrid term produser refers to an individual who is engaged in the activity of produsage. This concept is similar and related to commons-based peer production, a term coined by Yochai Benkler.

== Characteristics ==
According to Bruns, produsage has four defining features: 1) Open participation and communal evaluation; 2) Fluid heterarchy through ad hoc meritocracies; 3) Palimpsestic unfinished artifacts in a continuing process; and 4) Common property and individual rewards. An example of this discussion feature is the Wikipedia Talk page, which facilitates an open discussion between users in evaluating the quality of work created by previous users.

=== Open participation ===
A key characteristic of produsage is a collaboration between produsers to create content rather than working as individuals. The creation of content is frequently done by a number of different users rather than one single author. The produsage model provides tools that are designed and adapted to encourage open discussion. An example of this discussion feature is the Wikipedia Talk page, which facilitates an open discussion between users in evaluating the quality of work created by previous users.

Participation in a produsage model is also voluntary. Unlike a hierarchical community, there is no predetermined division of labor, but rather self-selected and voluntary tasks. The community considers the usefulness and relevancy of the contributions—ideas, comments, and edits—made by participants. The contributions that tend to be further evaluated and developed are the relevant and usable ones, while the irrelevant and unusable ones tend to be ignored. Even though the substantiality of useful contributions may vary drastically, they all positively contribute to the overall quality of the project. The participants who consistently make worthy contributions will be viewed as leaders amongst their peers.

Bruns also states that there is usually unrestricted access to most produsage models. An unlimited number of participants, allows more people to assess, critique, and analyze the existing contributions, increasing the quality of the outcome. In this sense, inclusivity is highly encouraged while exclusivity is highly discouraged. Bruns also brings forth the point that it is beneficial for the community to interact with other organizations, as it broadens the range of knowledge in which they can use to formulate a more impactful message. Therefore, the overall organizational structure of a produsage model is based on collaboration, participation, and inclusivity.

=== Fluid heterarchy, ad hoc meritocracy ===
Large numbers of participants, who comply with the features of produsage, are a part of successful produsage sites. Produsage models need to be available to participants of all skill levels and abilities. Axel Bruns notes that while there may be disproportionate levels of contributions, produsers have to feel unrestricted and granted equal access to make contributions. A balance of structure and openness is required in produsage communities. Oversight by small groups can create unwanted control and absolute freedom disrupts cohesion. In order to achieve this balance, produsage communities elect leaders based on the quality of contributions made. In the case for some newer sites, however, moderators of communities may arise at random or the earliest member.

The leadership structure in produsage communities are, as Bruns puts it, in "constant flux." Power recedes if leaders become idle. As such, leaders are not only encouraged to make relevant contributions to the community, but are also expected to do so with consistency. The fluctuation and redistribution of leadership creates a flexible, fluid network of produsers. Axel Bruns states that the fluidity of structure allows for individuals or tiny groups to emerge as decision makers, rather than having the whole community's approval at every stage. Standard models of structures consist of a top down model where leaders overlook, and have the final say in content creation. Produsage sites, instead, opt for an all-access model where participants are granted transparency. Leadership in this model removes command and control over participants; allowing produsers to make contributions as they see fit. Communities within produsage sites form through common interest of individuals, resulting in leadership rising from within these groups. The constant granting of leadership produces a community driven site where the community decides the direction the site is heading.

=== Palimpsestic artifacts and granularity ===
Axel Bruns challenges conventional ideas of production and consumerism by offering a perspective of the community in which producers are continually contributing by writing, rewriting, updating and suggesting ways to improve content. Content that is produced by produsers and the medium which holds the content is in a constant state of ongoing modification. Bruns characterizes this constituent factor of produsage as palimpsestic. Palimpsestic classifies objects as having the quality of being written and rewritten through many instances over time and showing evidence of that change. The exchange of interactions as produsers collaborate, establishes and builds the artifact, which becomes both a source of information as well as an environment where opinions, ideas and revisions are addressed, discussed and refashioned. He specifically points out that the framework and design of Wikipedia, which stands as an example of a holistic palimpsestic artifact in its nature. Artifact, as defined by Bruns, is a source of produser-created content. Bruns describes Wikipedia as being a continual developing process of produser-led expansion of knowledge, which is repeatedly over-written and multi-layered. Since virtually all users can contribute to an existing content on Wikipedia, there is always motivation to further improve upon it, by way of tools such as the Talk Page where users can interact and collaborate to push an article to a refined and more polished product. He identifies this characteristics as a stigmergic collaboration, where any user can have access to the artifact and add on their contribution to the original mark. Most often, produsage sites offer the architectural tools which enable produsers to record the history of the development of materials, thus users are able to trace back the evaluation of materials through its various stages. An example is the produsage site ccMixter, a community music site using open source multimedia management system to allow users to create music remixes on top of and in replacement of the original track.

In order for a production to be palimpsestic, the goal for its content must be granular. Bruns argues that granularity offers produsers a way to connect and contribute to a source or artifact in a way which is relevant to their background and knowledge. By anchoring multiplicity of viewpoints and interest to one source, content becomes more valuable, accurate and comprehensible, which is often a common goal of sources which provide information. He states it is characteristic of sources which promote produsage to be divisible into different components, each of which can be individually and independently produced by different users. This allows for the accumulation of skills and knowledge from a diverse background, rather than from a concentrated number of producers.

=== Common property, individual rewards ===
Axel Bruns describes the connection between common property and individual rewards within produsage. He states that participation in produsage is motivated by the ability of individual produsers to contribute to a shared purpose. This shared purpose is represented in the ability of produsage to create motivation among produsers and that the content being worked upon remains accessible and open to everyone. In order for a diverse community to contribute and engage in produsage, there must be few obstacles that would impede their contributions. There must be plentiful and accessible existing content available for produsers to edit and contribute to, along with minimal obstacles that involve technical and legal restrictions. For example, Bruns states that when individuals engage in collaborative work, enforcing intellectual property rights may hinder them from editing or working on their peers' work. As a result, an alternative method for imposing intellectual property rights is needed in order for produsage to function efficiently. Therefore, he argues that produsers may need to declare existing content as common community property, such as through a Creative Commons license.

However, any attempt from individuals or groups within or outside of the produsage group to capitalize on the content of information shared must be avoided. Any content that is worked upon by a community must remain easily accessible and that edits or modifications to the content must be available under similar conditions. In addition, any contributions made by participants to the shared content must be rewarded and recognized whenever appropriate.

Although the content is shared communally, produsers still gain personal merit from their own contributions to the project being worked upon. In addition, these individual rewards are a source for further motivation for participation by the community in produsage projects. Such personal merit honors the individual by adding to their network of relationships and those beyond the community. Therefore, the main reward in engaging in produsage is personal status, rather than financial gain.

According to Bruns, one of the major motivations in engaging in produsage is to create a lasting work, through other scholars have argued that in some cases, particularly related to collaborative media creation, a moe important motivation may be related to the performance and experiencing a joint outcome by the creators and audience.

== Overlapping concepts and other theories ==
=== Corresponding concepts and Henry Jenkins' media convergence ===
Axel Bruns' idea of produsage aims to describe how people in this digital age are communicating, through the explanation of four different characteristics; open participation, common property, palimpsest artifact and granularity as well as fluid heterarchy and holoptism. Each characteristic in itself pose a different aspect of what Bruns identifies as produser-led creation of content. Although Bruns' ideas are unique in characteristic, they tend to overlap with existing ideas and theories from other scholars, one of these being media scholar Henry Jenkins, a professor of communication, cinematic arts and journalism at University of Southern California. Henry Jenkins, a long time educator and writer of over nine books, adopted the term and concept of media convergence which was in currency at the time and offered a definition through his book. Media convergence can be described as a process by which media of all mediums are expanded, collaborated, transformed and adapted through space and time. Jenkins describes how the convergence of media occurs through a process in the individuals brain, but what is published by producers and the reactions in which individuals have toward content is the result of this convergence. Jenkins aims to conceptualize how content accumulates meaning and value and how the plethora of platforms of interaction accessible today encourages users to participate in a culture of content which is constantly being reshaped and reworked through digital communication and collective intelligence. Jenkins concept of media convergence overlaps with Bruns' idea of produsage where media convergence can be simply summarized as the logical placement and collaboration of media content, similarly produsage can be defined as the spread of idea, culture and opinions though media. In a speech given at USC, Jenkins speaks about five main concepts; content is participatory, content is remixable, content is spreadable, content is global and content may be independent.

Henry Jenkins states content is participatory, which means platforms of media provide content which encourages users to interact and participate within its community. He explains that participation require low barriers of for expression where individuals are given things to do through media and often feel a strong support for sharing their creations with other members. He explains that users are motivated to connect and engage in storytelling which are most often appropriated through grassroots communities. He contends that within participatory culture, there is a system of informal mentorship in which those users who are more advanced mentor those that are either new in participating or rather those that lack the skill set to adequately participate. Jenkins gives the example of Wikipedia and explains that it allows and encourages user-led discussion, modification and recreation. Similarly, Bruns' idea of open participation emphasizes that participation of producers is voluntary and is facilitated through platforms which designed to encourage open discussion therefore, content is created by multiple produsers. He also states that producers believe that their contributions as well as the opinions of other users are important. Both Jenkin's and Bruns' concepts exemplifies that within the new media age, content is no longer created by one producer and consumed by the rest, but rather content is constantly remodeled, recreated and refashioned by multiple users within an open-ended community that encourages contribution and participation by its members.

Another characteristic of media convergence is the concept of remixable content. Jenkins defines remixable content as the playfulness in which users input and ground their content around; he states that due to the fact that technology is more accessible in this digital age, it becomes less complicated for users to transform content in the way they would like on a variety of different mediums and platforms. Remixable content is a result of users and producers taking ownership of content and reshaping and remixing it for a variety of reasons which may either be for enjoyment or cultural instances. These remixes or mashups of content allow media to be spread over space and time at extremely fast rates which propels the familiarity of the content from user to user. Jenkins uses the example of the series of pepper spray cop remixes in which a picture of a cop pepper spraying a group of protesters was remade through a series of platforms by users all across the nation. Just a few days prior to the first circulating picture, 200 mashups of the pepper spray cop were created. Similarly, Bruns' states that a characteristic of produsage is a palimpsest artifact, which can be defined as content which is written and rewritten over again constantly with the goal of improving upon the source. Both Jenkins and Bruns conceptualize that user contribution is an essential characteristics of new media communication and consumption, in which individuals absorb content and remake or refashion it to either clarify an idea, promote a message or simply for enjoyment.

In addition, Jenkins elaborates on the idea that content is spreadable. He states that the spreadability of content is a logic of circulation and that content gains value as it travels through culture. He utilized viral videos as an example to show that individuals who share and spread this content are contributing to increasing its value, whether for potential commercial interests or for entertainment. As a result, he states that circulation is a grassroots hybrid system and shaped by the individuals from the bottom up who pass along the content by their own choice. This type of spreadability contrasts the traditional type of distribution from corporations who are the main entity distributing content or products. Similarly, Bruns' concept of open participation elaborates on the idea that the more individuals working and collaborating produces higher quality content. In addition, it emphasis collaboration rather than one individual taking sole ownership of a piece of work. Jenskins' and Bruns' theories compare in that they both value multiple individuals collaborating to improve upon a piece of work or contribute to spreading its content. Jenskins' theory of media convergence values that it requires multiple individuals to work together to spread content throughout culture, while Bruns' theory values the collaborative effort of individuals working together to critique, analyze and reconstruct a piece of work.

Jenkins also discuses in his theory that content may be global. As individuals help spread content by sharing it with people within their networks, the content has the opportunity to be shared outside of the original culture it originated from. He utilizes the example of the emergence of anime in the United States to show the power of spreadability in sharing content to different communities and cultures. Anime originally emerged in Japan, however, as anime fans began circulating the content online and informally translated anime shows into English, it spread to audiences in the United States and more Americans became a part of the anime fan base. As a result, the anime fan base in Japan contributed to the popularization of Anime in a global context and introduced new content to the American marketplace. In comparison to Bruns' concept of open participation, Jenkins adds on that the spreadability of content may bring new audiences from a global standpoint, thus increasing the number of individuals who are able to participate and engage with the content or product.

Lastly, Jenkins characterizes content as independent. He states that while mass producers like corporations may have an advantage over independent producers in regards to visibility, such as indie film makers, independent producers still have opportunities to get their content exposed to the public. For example, he utilizes kick starters as an example of a funding source for independent producers and the creation of their content. Independent producers have the power to appeal to audiences that the heads of corporations or commercial structures are also trying to attract. As a result, in comparison to Bruns' concept of fluid heterarchy, which states that there is a fluid level of leadership in a produser group, independent producers showcase a fluid level of leadership against large corporations because they still have resources and networks to get their content across to their desired audiences.

=== Overlap with Tapscott and Williams's theory of collaborative learning ===
Don Tapscott and Anthony D. Williams promote "collaborative and social models of learning" as methods for developing a successful "Global Network for Higher Learning." Currently, the teaching model involves professors disseminating information to students to absorb, memorize, and recall on tests; however, Tapscott and Williams urge that true learning occurs when students collaboratively explore and discuss what they are learning about. According to a study done by Richard J. Light at the Harvard Graduate School of Education, the success of students in higher levels of education is dependent on their ability to organize and participate in study groups. Students who formed study groups were more prepared and involved in their coursework and retained more information than those who did not form groups. This resembles Bruns's definition of open participation.

In 1999, the Massachusetts Institute of Technology integrated OpenCourseWare as a way of harnessing information on the internet for students. A project that began in 2002, in 5 years, MIT managed to publish its entire curriculum of lecture notes and exams online. This information is made available for students and teachers, even from other institutions, to be "freely used, copied, distributed, translated and modified". Professors have equal access to OpenCourseWare regardless of the institution they belong to. Tapscott and Williams propose that student users should be able to share their desired education structure with professors. Professors then make curriculum structure decisions based on the advice of the community of students and professors to optimize learning outcomes. Tapscott and Williams suggest that this creates more value for the high cost of education. Unrestricted information made readily available for anyone to use, community interaction between students and professors without hierarchical lines, demonstrates produsage's fluid heterarchy. The degree's regularly updated coursework is also reminiscent of palimpsestic artifacts.

In addition, Tapscott and Williams explain how universities and professors sharing their course materials through OpenCourseWare would allow teachers to globally participate in forming more well-rounded and engaging courses, instead of forming them individually. Since OpenCourseWare freely allows access to everyone, the information shared on this public domain is considered common property. This aligns with the common property characteristic of produsage. The universities and teachers are produsers who are contributing to a shared purpose – improving coursework for the benefit of other teachers and students.

== Examples ==
=== Bruns' examples ===
Bruns highlights the following examples in his book Blogs, Wikipedia, Second Life, and Beyond: From Production to Produsage and other works:

- ccMixter, ccMixter, a collaborative music software which enables produsers to upload original music as well as remix and remake tracks uploaded by other users. All music which is upload is governed under the Creative Commons license, which therefore allows every user to access all music without limitations. Bruns describes ccMixter as a source of content that encourages users to participate in both uploading original music as well as remixing other's tracks, and that these tracks which are remixed become a palimpsest artifact, constantly rewritten and edited.
- Citizen journalism. Axel Bruns states that citizen journalism is an example of produsage, in which it relies on its users to work as participants in evaluating, publicizing and responding to news stories. He argues that citizen journalism draws from voluntary contributions from its participants who utilize technology and the Internet to coordinate the process of citizen journalism. Citizen journalism may take place in websites such as Indymedia, Slashdot, OhmyNews, and The Huffington Post. Bruns also expands on the importance of social networking sites, such as Twitter, serving as platforms for citizen journalism to take place. Commentary on websites like The Huffington Post and Twitter respond to already existing and published news stories. However, Bruns states that it collects and combines these already existing materials and contextualizes them by pointing out new ways for their interpretation and analysis. As a result, he claims that comments com rrr pile information by highlighting its implications and are a form of news curation. In addition, Bruns utilizes we all go we go to go Twitter's hashtag system as an example of providing an open and accessible space for individuals to participate in citizen journalism and produsage. When users tag their posts with hashtags, they are enabling for a larger conversation to take place with other Twitter users and further extend the potential number of participants engaging in citizen journalism. The process of news curation is decentralized and shared; Twitter users collaborate on compiling, collaborating and curating information. As a result, Twitter is an online space that allows its users to share, report, and discuss news stories in a collaborative and open group.
- Clickworkers is a small NASA experimental project that uses public volunteers for scientific tasks. Enthusiasts with different levels of skill were engaged to identify craters on Mars. These science hobbyists accurately identified Mars craters with professional precision. While there is a division between NASA and the engaged participants, Bruns acknowledges that power dynamics are not disregarded in produsage models but are accepted when there is mutual benefit.
- Fan fiction communities such as Sugar Quill represent produsage models in text. The collaborative efforts of the community to examine the relevancy and possibility of seamless integration of these fan-written stories into the fictional universe they are fans of, and in some cases collectively write a piece of fan fiction. The communal evaluation of the community fosters a collective sense of ownership of a piece of work that goes through regular revisions. As no one person has more say over the quality of the story, this displays the heterarchical model of produsage in place.
- Flickr is a photo-editing and photo-sharing site which also enables users to be a part of communities or "pools" which are made of other users with common interests. Bruns explains that users engage in interaction by commenting on and coediting photographs, which they call "mashups." These mash-ups are considered common property and are composed of user-led creative content which is continually edited and reedited by users through open participation.
- Open source software is a computer software in which the copyright holder allows the source code to be openly available for anyone to alter, edit, or enhance it. The software is in a state of continuous evolution as produsers collaborate to improve the existing source code and/or repair any defects. Through open participation and communal evaluation, the quality of the open-source software advances at a much more rapid rate than that of a closed model.
- Wikipedia. Axel Bruns utilizes Wikipedia as an example to illustrate the characteristics of produsage. He states that Wikipedia is a collaborative online encyclopedia and differs from traditional encyclopedias because they only rely on the contributions of credible experts. As a result, traditional encyclopedias exclude participation from the public and lack a diverse group of contributors to engage, analyze and critique the work of the group. However, Wikipedia values the produsage characteristics of open participation by allowing anyone to edit a page on their website. Users are able to start new pages they wish to elaborate on or edit an existing page. In addition, users can read the work of others who have collaborated on a page before and critique or build upon what has already been written on a specific topic. Bruns also points out that Wikipedia embraces the produsage principle of fluid heterarchies. There is no sole leader on a Wikipedia page, thus users are allowed to freely evaluate each other's content. He adds that those who contribute more to a page may have visibility in the community in contrast to those who have lower rates of participation, however, the leadership is always in flux.

=== Modern examples ===
The following are popular, common day examples of produsage that Bruns does not highlight in his book:

- Instagram: As technology advances and more complex apps are developed, user have access to more information and more ways of sharing and contributing to a community. One example of this modern content exist within Instagram, which is a photo and video sharing app that enables produsers to both post images which is then shared to either the public or selected users, as well as save/screenshot, remake and repost other users content. An example of this within the app is signified by what is called "memes," which are parody revisions of previously posted images/animations. Instagram creates and promotes a produsage environment, where access is only limited to having a smart device, open participation is encouraged, users feel motivated to post interesting images as well as absorb and recreate content uploaded by other users.
- Internet memes like those popularized on Facebook, Reddit, 4chan, and other social media websites demonstrate another occurrence of produsage. An internet meme is an image, video, or hashtag that portrays a cultural idea, symbol, and/or behavior pattern via the internet. People often create memes by reworking existing photos or videos that others have previously posted (generally done to create humorous content). Participants of social media platforms often comment on, share, or re-edit these internet memes.
- Photoshop contest like the ones held in the subreddit /r/PhotoshopBattles is a popular instance of produsage. Users upload photos which the community is encouraged to edit. Similar to Flickr, all users have equal access to the image which they can then upload back onto the thread where comments are left, and re-edits will continue to take place.

== See also ==
- Commons based peer-production – Method of producing value
- Mass collaboration – Many people working on a single project
- Prosumer – Person who consumes and produces a product
- Wisdom of the crowds – Collective perception of a group of people
