= Axel Bruns =

German-Australian media scholar

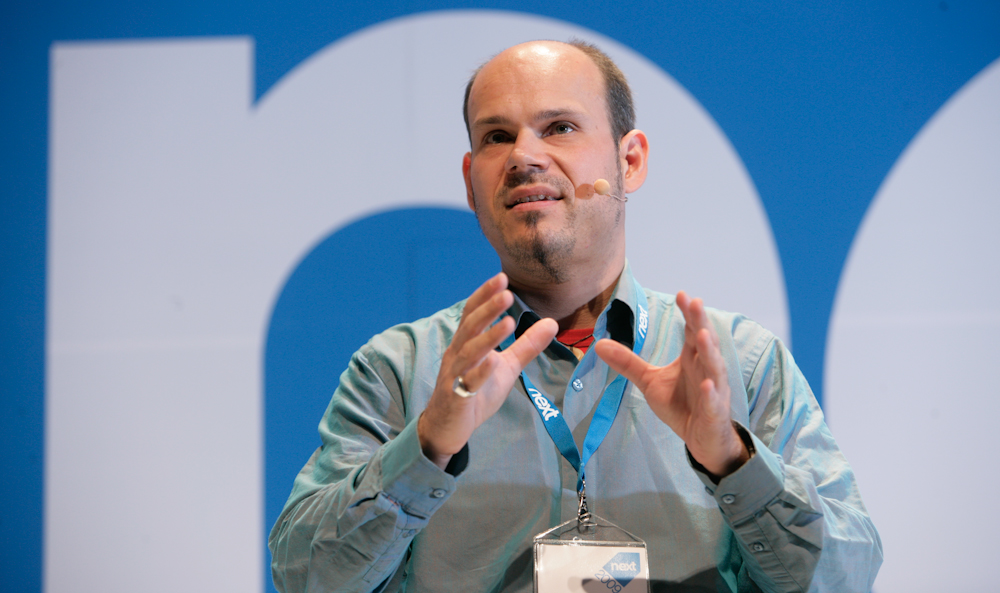
- Burns in 2009
- Born: 1970 (age 55–56)
- Education: University of Queensland (PhD)
- Notable work: Blogs, Wikipedia, Second Life and Beyond

Axel Bruns FAHA (born 1970) is a German-Australian media scholar. He is a Professor of Communication and Media Studies at QUT Digital Media Research Centre, Queensland University of Technology in Brisbane, Australia, and a Chief Investigator in the ARC Centre of Excellence for Automated Decision-Making and Society.

== Career ==
Bruns is the author of Blogs, Wikipedia, Second Life and Beyond: From Production to Produsage (2008) and Gatewatching: Collaborative Online News Production (2005).

In 1997, Bruns was a co-founder of the premier online academic publisher M/C (Media and Culture), which publishes M/C Journal and M/C Reviews, and he continues to serve as M/C's General Editor. In 2000, he co-founded dotlit: The Online Journal of Creative Writing.

After a brief period studying physics in his native Germany, Bruns' research focus changed to Media and Cultural studies. He completed a PhD at the University of Queensland in 2002 that analysed the emerging Website genre of Resource Centre Sites such as indymedia and Slashdot. Bruns found that "Resource Centre Site produsers engage in an adaptation of both traditional journalistic gatekeeping methodologies and librarianly resource collection approaches to the Web environment: in the absence of gates to keep online, they have become 'gatewatchers', observing the publication of news and information in other sources and publicising its existence through their own sites."

His findings in this formulative thesis have spurred much of his further research into the online media field, including two of his key concepts, Produsage and Gatewatching. Bruns is an expert on the impact of user-led content creation in the fields of produsers and produsage, blogging, gatewatching and citizen journalism and learning and teaching in the digital age. 'His current work focuses especially on the study of user participation in social media spaces such as Twitter in the context of acute events.'

Bruns was elected a Fellow of the Australian Academy of the Humanities in 2023.

== Influences ==
Bruns draws on the works of scholars from a number of different fields. Produsage has evolved out of Yochai Benkler's work in commons based peer-production, which Benkler has described as "the emergence of a new information environment, one in which individuals are free to take a more active role than was possible in the industrial information economy of the twentieth century." Bruns offers the concept of produsers as re-development on Alvin Toffler's ideas of the prosumer, he believes Toffler's definition of the prosumer is "anything but the active, content-creating, self-directed individual whom we may encounter in the produsage community…they merely consume commercial products rather than actively contributing their own ideas."

Bruns' development of gatewatching theory comes out of the work of Herbert Gans and his ideas on "multiperspectiviality". He believes that the plurality of media forms currently available may allow for the realization of a Gansian mediasphere. "It is possible to suggest, however, that the news, and the news media, be multiperspectival, presenting and representing as many perspectives as possible – and at the very least, more than today."

Bruns' contemporaries and influences in the fields of citizen journalism, produsage and gatewatching include: Henry Jenkins, Yochai Benkler, Clay Shirky, J.D. Lasica, Alfred Hermida. Jack Lule, Graham Meikle amongst a host of other new media and online media scholars.

== Produsage ==
Bruns' research into user-led content production, or produsage, investigates the "changed content production value chain model in collaborative online environments: in these environments, a strict producer/consumer dichotomy no longer applies – instead, users are almost always also able to be producers of content, and often necessarily so in the very act of using it."

He identifies four key characteristics of these online environments:

- User Led Content Production
- Collaborative Engagement
- Palimpsestic, Iterative, Evolutionary Development
- Alternative Approaches to Intellectual Property
- Heterachichal, Permeable Community Structures

== Bibliography ==
- Axel Bruns. Gatewatching and news curation: Journalism, social media, and the public sphere. New York: Peter Lang, 2018.
- Katrin Weller, Axel Bruns, Jean Burgess, Merja Mahrt, and Cornelius Puschmann, eds. Twitter and Society. New York: Peter Lang, 2014.
- John Hartley, Jean Burgess, and Axel Bruns, eds. A Companion to New Media Dynamics. London: Blackwell, 2013.
- Axel Bruns. Blogs, Wikipedia, Second Life and Beyond: From Production to Produsage. New York: Peter Lang, 2008.
- Axel Bruns and Joanne Jacobs, eds. Uses of Blogs. New York: Peter Lang, 2006.
- Axel Bruns. Gatewatching: Collaborative Online News Production. New York: Peter Lang, 2005.
