= Media deconvergence =

Media deconvergence is an original term coined to describe the breaking apart of companies through spin-offs, split-offs and demergers, which grew in numbers as a consequence of the failure of many mergers and consolidations realized in the late 1990s and in the first decade of the 21st century in the media and communications sectors. AOL-Time Warner, whose merger took place in 2000 and ended in 2009, and Viacom, which split into the CBS Corporation and the current incarnation of Viacom in 2005, are good examples of media (market) deconvergence.

Like media convergence, media deconvergence is believed to be a consequence of technological convergence, as many companies in these sectors have followed either the strategy of expanding their reach with mergers and acquisitions, or the strategy of refocusing their operations around core activities, by splitting up or spinning off secondary activities into dedicated companies. As both these strategies have been adopted by companies in the media and communications sector at different points in time, from the viewpoint of the sector, media deconvergence is a process that occurs as a reaction, but also in parallel to, the convergence of media markets.

More recently, media deconvergence has also been applied more broadly to indicate other consequences and assumptions that are alternative to the process of media convergence, as it was traditionally or most commonly understood. As an example, media deconvergence has been used to describe a media environment that is becoming more complex, where more technologies and services are used, rather than one where old technologies (like television or radio) are replaced by new ones. Media deconvergence has also been used to refute the idea that technological convergence is favoured by deregulation, because technological convergence introduces new challenges, such as the protection of privacy or the respect of copyrights, which require new policies and regulations. Also, rather than concentrating on the possibilities that have become available from accessing the same digital content from different devices, media deconvergence privileges the study of transmedia flow of content, such as transmedia storytelling. The term "deconvergence" was chosen and preferred to the term "divergence", because the processes described by media deconvergence unfolds also in parallel to, instead of departing from, processes described by media convergence.
