= Blogs, Wikipedia, Second Life and Beyond: From Production to Produsage =

Book of new media in 2008

- Author: Axel Bruns
- Language: English
- Subjects: New media Wikipedia; User-generated content Social media
- Genre: Human-Computer Interaction; Communications
- Publisher: Peter Lang
- Publication date: 2008
- Publication place: United States
- Pages: 418
- ISBN: 9780820488660
- OCLC: 181910115

Blogs, Wikipedia, Second Life and Beyond: From Production to Produsage is a 2008 book about the new media by Axel Bruns.

The book has been credited with coining and popularizing the term produsage.

== See also ==
- prosumer
