= William Uricchio =

American media scholar

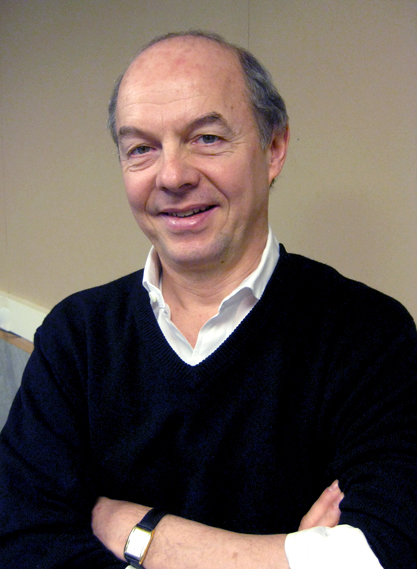
- Born: Bethesda, Maryland, United States
- Education: MA and Ph.D., Cinema Studies
- Alma mater: New York University
- Occupation: University Professor
- Years active: 1982-2023
- Employer(s): Massachusetts Institute of Technology, Utrecht University
- Title: Professor of Comparative Media Studies (MIT), Professor of Comparative Media History (Utrecht University)
- Awards: The Berlin Prize; Guggenheim, Fulbright and Alexander von Humboldt Awards

William Charles Uricchio is an American media scholar and Professor of Comparative Media Studies at the Massachusetts Institute of Technology and Professor of Comparative Media History at Utrecht University in the Netherlands. Together with Henry Jenkins, he helped to build and direct MIT's Comparative Media Studies program. Uricchio was Principal Investigator of the Singapore-MIT GAMBIT Game Lab. He is founder and Principal Investigator of the MIT Open Documentary Lab. He is also (co-)author or (co-)editor of several books including Collective Wisdom: Co-Creating Media for Equity and Justice; We Europeans? Media, Representations, Identity; Media Cultures; Die Anfänge des deutschen Fernsehens: Kritische Annäherungen an die Entwicklung bis 1945; Reframing Culture: The Case of the Vitagraph Quality Films; The Many Lives of the Batman: Critical Approaches to a Superhero and his Media; and Many More Lives of the Batman. Uricchio is series editor (along with Jesper Juul and Geoff Long) of the MIT Press Playful Thinking Series on game related topics.

== Education and recognition ==
Uricchio earned his MA and Ph.D. degrees in cinema studies from New York University. His subsequent work was supported by Guggenheim, Alexander von Humboldt, and Fulbright fellowships, The Berlin Prize, The Mercator Prize, and a fellowship at the Institute for Advanced Study, Lichtenberg-Kolleg, Georg-August-Universität Göttingen.

He was Bonnier Visiting Professor of Journalism, Media and Communication at Stockholm University; DREAM Visiting Professor in Denmark; and visiting professor at the Freie Universität Berlin (American Studies); The University of Siena; The University of Science and Technology of China (Communications); Philipps-Universität Marburg (Medienwissenschaft); and Stockholm University (Television Studies).

== Research Fields ==
Uricchio studies the beginnings of various media forms, and researches the histories of "old" media when they were new. His work explores how media technologies and cultural behaviors interact and how they are used for purposes of representation, indication, the formation of publics, and power. He uses historical precedent to anticipate the behaviors of the new, and draws upon the new to reveal long overlooked patterns in the historical past.

These interests have taken form in several different research domains. One portion of his work focuses on television's emergence as an idea and practice in the late 19th century, where Uricchio argues for a genealogy rooted in the telegraph and telephone rather than photography and film. This work, among other things, locates early television within emergent digital and acoustic technologies, and explores the interplay of ideas regarding presence with the period's technological capacities. He shows that television as a concept preceded film as a medium, establishing a horizon of expectations that helps to account for film's obsession with liveness during its first decade.

Uricchio researches the multiple and competing ideas of television deployed in Germany between 1935 and 1944. This work shows how histories of the medium were shaped by the ideologically fortuitous division of records regarding programming (the Federal Republic of Germany’s control of the Propaganda Ministry archives) and technological infrastructure (the GDR’s control of the Post Ministry archives). It reveals quite divergent deployments of television, helping to complicate the medium and de-naturalize the post-war "taken-for-grantedness" of domestic television. And it documents the deep reliance of the National Socialist era German electronics industry on multi-national partnerships, patents and licensing agreements.

Together with Roberta Pearson, he researched American early cinema audiences, taste hierarchies and cultural meanings. Published as Reframing Culture, this work explored the use of high-culture figures in the then-contested medium of film, comparing modes of representation across cultural fields, and overturning the argument that these topics were part of an attempt to purge the audience of immigrants and members of the working class. This research pioneered new methods for doing historical work on "conditions of reception" and mapped out a historically grounded project of intertextual inquiry.

Representation also makes up an important strand of his research. Uricchio has written about the status of non-fiction imagery, focusing on the representation of the city from the actualités and panoramas of early cinema, through city symphonies, to digital urban simulations. This research explores historically changing conventions for representing reality, showing affinities among visual forms, sociological studies, and the period's changing scientific understanding of the physical world. His research lab at MIT focuses on the interactive documentary and its ability to enable widespread participation, while at the same time challenging established notions of authorship, reading practices and the stable text. The MIT Open Documentary Lab has also used this opportunity to re-interrogate the past, finding there ample precedents for interactive, re-mixed, and location-based media, as argued in Moments of Innovation. Behind this, as in much of Uricchio's work, is the idea that the "new" enables the re-evaluation of the old, and the discovery there of overlooked precedent. The research in interactive documentary and television has also led Uricchio to focus on the media's role in 'pointing out' and 'indicating' rather than only representing. The Open Documentary Lab's Docubase provides an annotated compendium of innovative digital documentary forms. A recent report entitled Mapping the Intersection of Two Cultures, written by Uricchio and the Open Doc Lab team for the MacArthur Foundation, explores the relevance of interactive and immersive documentaries for digital journalism. And in his co-authored book with MIT Press,Collective Wisdom, Uricchio and colleagues explore the possibilities and implications of co-creation methodologies to produce ethical and equitable media, particularly in the reality-facing domain.

Another part of his research on representation examines the cultural work of algorithms. This research focuses on regime change in representation, as norms shift from the modern era's fixation with the stability of algorismic certainties to our current engagement with dynamic and multi-perspectival algorithmic processes. The algorithmic processes behind such collaborative cultural forms as Photosynth, Google, Wikipedia – and increasingly financial and cartographic practices – serve as the focus of this research.

In addition to writing about the history of media, Uricchio also writes about media and the construction of history. This work considers popular historical engagements in such sectors as historical video games, historical reenactments and fandom, and amateur genealogical research. The roles of media as sites of historical expertise and display and as enablers of alternate historical viewpoints, together with their larger coincidence with the post-structuralist turn in historiography, lay at the core of this research.

== Works ==
- William Uricchio, Katerina Cizek, et al., Collective Wisdom: Co-Creating Media for Equity and Justice (Cambridge:MIT Press, 2022)
- William Uricchio, Roberta E. Pearson, Will Brooker, Many More Lives of the Batman (London: British Film Institute & Palgrave, 2015)
- William Uricchio, ed., We Europeans? Media, Representations, Identity (Chicago: University of Chicago Press; Bristol: Intellect Press, 2008)
- William Uricchio and Susanne Kinnebrock, eds., Media Cultures (Heidelberg: Universitätsverlag Winter, 2006)
- William Uricchio, Media, Simultaneity, Convergence: Culture and Technology in an Age of Intermediality. Monograph (Utrecht: Universiteit Utrecht, 1997)
- William Uricchio and Pearson, R.E., Reframing Culture: The Case of the Vitagraph Quality Films (Princeton, NJ: Princeton University Press, 1993).
- William Uricchio,. Die Anfänge des deutschen Fernsehens: Kritische Annäherungen an die Entwicklung bis 1945. Ed. (Tübingen: Max Niemeyer Verlag, 1991)
- William Uricchio and Pearson, R.E., The Many Lives of the Batman: Critical Approaches to a Superhero and His Media. (New York: Routledge, Chapman & Hall; London: The British Film Institute, 1991).
