= Alfred Hermida =

British-Canadian digital media scholar and journalism educator

Alfred Hermida is a British-Canadian digital media scholar, and journalism educator. He is a Full Professor at the University of British Columbia School of Journalism, Writing, and Media, where he served as director for five and a half years (June 2015 – December 2020).

In 2017, he co-founded and launched The Conversation Canada with his UBC Journalism colleague, Mary Lynn Young, bringing academics and experienced journalists together to share timely analysis and commentary drawing from research, evidence and insights. He was a BBC journalist for 16 years and was a founding member of the BBCNews.com website in 1997.

His work focuses on investigating the convergence of media technologies, industries, content and audiences, through scholarly papers, applied projects and media activities designed to bridge theory and practice.

He is the co-author with Mary Lynn Young of Data Journalism and the Regeneration of News, published by Routledge in 2019.

His book, Tell Everyone: Why We Share and Why It Matters, was published by DoubleDay Canada. The book examines how sharing is shaping our notions of an informed and engaged public, a media ecology of competing ideas, and a responsive political establishment. The book won the National Business Book Award in 2015.

In 2011, he co-authored Participatory Journalism: Guarding Open Gates at Online Newspapers, published by Wiley-Blackwell. He is also the co-editor of The Sage Handbook of Digital Journalism (Sage, 2016). His research has been published in Journalism Studies, Journalism Practice and M/C Journal, and he has contributed numerous chapters to academic texts.

He was named an IBM CAS Canada Research Faculty Fellow in 2010, 2011 and 2012, and won the 2011 UBC President's Award for Public Education Through Media. He was nominated in the 2011 Digi Awards for Canada's top social media maven. In 2005, he was the first digital journalist to be a Knight-Wallace fellow at the University of Michigan.

Hermida worked for the BBC from 1990 to 2006. During his four years as daily news editor of the BBC News website, the site won the BAFTA for best news website four years in a row. He joined the website after seven years in BBC radio and television news, working for regional, national and international outlets. Four of these years were as a BBC foreign correspondent in North Africa and the Middle East, mainly covering the military coup and Islamic insurgency in Algeria and the Israeli-Palestinian peace negotiations. In February 1994, he was expelled from Tunisia for his coverage of human rights abuses.

He has a PhD from City University London.
