= Participatory culture =

Cultural production made through social interactions of different communities and groups

Participatory culture, is where people actively create, share, and contribute to published media. A culture in which individuals act as contributors or producers (prosumers). Opposing the concept of consumer culture.

Modern technological advancements (mostly personal computers and the Internet) have enabled private persons to create and publish media, usually through the Internet. Since technology enables new forms of expression and engagement in public discourse, participatory culture supports individual creation and informal relationships that pair novices with experts. This new culture, as it relates to the Internet, has been described as Web 2.0. In participatory culture, "young people creatively respond to a plethora of electronic signals and cultural commodities in ways that surprise their makers, finding meanings and identities never meant to be there and defying simple nostrums that bewail the manipulation or passivity of 'consumers'."

The increasing availability of the Internet increasingly enables people to work collaboratively, generate and disseminate news, ideas, and creative works, and connect with people who share similar goals and interests (see affinity groups). An early example of one of these shared interests among participatory culture "emerged in the 1960s, notably influenced by passionate fan communities, such as those surrounding the "Star Trek" series." Fans of the show would often write letters, meet up at conventions, and share personal stories relating to the series.

The potential of participatory culture for civic engagement and creative expression has been investigated by media scholar Henry Jenkins. In 2009, Jenkins and co-authors Ravi Purushotma, Katie Clinton, Margaret Weigel and Alice Robison authored a white paper entitled Confronting the Challenges of Participatory Culture: Media Education for the 21st Century. This paper describes a participatory culture as one:

1. With relatively low barriers to artistic expression and civic engagement
2. With strong support for creating and sharing one's creations with others
3. With some type of informal mentorship whereby what is known by the most experienced is passed along to novices
4. Where members believe that their contributions matter
5. Where members feel some degree of social connection with one another (at the least they care what other people think about what they have created).

== History ==
Participatory culture predates the Internet. The emergence of the Amateur Press Association in the middle of the 19th century is an example of historical participatory culture; at that time, young people were typing and printing their own publications by hand. These publications were mailed throughout a network of people and resemble modern social networks. The displacement of old media such as zines, radio shows, group projects, and gossip by new media such as blogs, podcasts, wikis, and social networks has greatly impacted society. The implications of the gradual shift from production to produsage are profound and will affect the core of culture, economy, society, and democracy.

Barrier to entry is an important factor for determining what defines participatory culture. An early example dates back to the early 2000's with "the emergence of user-friendly web publishing systems, such as LiveJournal (1999) and Xanga (2000), effectively removed the remaining barriers to entry into online spaces." Broader public internet connections caused the big shift into the modern feel of the culture.

== Forms ==
Memes as expression

Forms of participatory culture can be manifested in affiliations, expressions, collaborative problem solving, and circulations:

- Affiliations include both formal and informal memberships in online communities such as discussion boards or social media.
- Expression refers to the types of media that could be created. This may manifest as memes, fanfiction, or other forms of mash-ups.
- When individuals and groups work together on a particular form of media or media product, like a wiki, they engage in collaborative problem solving.
- Circulation refers to the means through which the communication may be spread. This could include blogs, vlogs, podcasts, and even some forms of social media.

Some of the most popular apps that involve participation include Facebook, Snapchat, Instagram, Tinder, LinkedIn, Twitter, and TikTok.

Fanfiction creators were one of the first communities to demonstrate how the public could participate in pop culture by changing, growing, and altering TV show storylines during their run times, as well as strengthening the series' popularity after the last episode aired. Some fan fiction creators develop theories and speculation, while others create 'new' material outside of the confines of the original content. Fans expand on the original story such as by putting the characters falling in love within the series through different adventures and sexualities. These communities are composed of audiences and readers from around the world, at different ages, with different backgrounds, coming together to develop theories and possibilities about current TV shows, books and films, or expand and continue the stories of works that are no longer in production.

== Social media ==
Viewers no longer blindly consume content distributed by large media corporations. Today, many consumers are "prosumers" who produce their own content. Social media platforms make it easier to reach global audiences.

=== Social media and politics ===
Social media has become a huge factor in politics and civics in elections, fundraising, spreading information, getting support for legislation and petitions, and other political activities. A study that showed the connection between Facebook messages among friends and how these messages have influenced political expression, voting, and information seeking in the 2012 United States presidential election. Social media mobilizes people easily and effectively, and does the same for the circulation of information. The impact that social media can have on elections was shown in the 2016 United States presidential election; hundreds of fake news stories about candidates were shared on Facebook tens of millions of times. Some people get deceived by fake news and vote based on false information.

=== Web 2.0 ===
With hardware, users can upload content to the internet to be reached by a wide audience. Websites like Flickr, Wikipedia, and Facebook create online communities for content creation.

As the mindsets and skillsets of participatory practices have been taken up, people are becoming more likely to exploit new tools and technology in new ways. One example is the use of cellphone technology to engage "smart mobs" for political change worldwide. In countries where cellphone usage exceeds use of any other form of digital technology, passing information via mobile phone has helped bring about significant political and social change. Notable examples include the so-called "Orange Revolution" in Ukraine, the overthrow of Philippine President Joseph Estrada, and regular political protests worldwide.

=== Relation to smartphones ===
Smartphones combine the elements of interactivity, identity, and mobility. Viewers become actively involved in making decisions, navigating pages, contributing their own content and choosing what links to follow. The consumer role shifts from a passive receiver to an active contributor. Smartphones give users various ways to get personally involved with multiple forms of media at the same time, in a nonlinear way.

Smartphones also change the perception of identity; a user can hide behind an avatar, false profile, or simply an idealized self when interacting with others online. There is no accountability to be who one says one is. The ability to slide in and out of roles changes media's effect on culture and users themselves.

=== Producers, consumers, and "produsage" ===
In Vincent Miller's Understanding Digital Culture, he makes the argument that the lines between producer and consumers have become blurry. Producers create content and cultural objects, and consumers are the audience or purchasers of those objects. By referring to Axel Bruns' idea of "prosumer," Miller argues:

With the advent of convergent new media and the plethora of choice in sources for information, as well as the increased capacity for individuals to produce content themselves, this shift away from producer hegemony to audience or consumer power would seem to have accelerated, thus eroding the producer-consumer distinction.

"Prosumers" are the end result of an increasingly-used strategy that encourages feedback between producers and consumers, "which allows for more consumer influence over the production of goods."

Bruns (2008) refers to produsage as a form of community collaboration that participants can access to share "content, contributions, and tasks throughout the networked community". This is similar to how Wikipedia allows users to write, edit, and use content. As active participants, producers are empowered by their participation as network builders. Bruns (2008) describes the empowerment for users as different from the typical "top-down mediated spaces of the traditional mediaspheres". Produsage occurs when the users are the producers and vice versa, which eliminates the need for "top-down" interventions. The collaboration of each participant is based on a principle of inclusivity; each member contributes valuable information for another user to use, add to, or change. In a community of learners, collaboration through produsage can provide access to content for every participant, not just those with some kind of authority. Every participant has authority.

This leads to Bruns' (2008) idea of "equipotentiality: the assumption that while the skills and abilities of all the participants in the produsage project are not equal, they have an equal ability to make a worthy contribution to the project". Because there are no more distinctions between producers and consumers, every participant has an equal chance to participate meaningfully in produsage.

In July 2020, an academic publication reported on the nature and rise of the "robot prosumer", derived from modern-day technology and related participatory culture, which was anticipated earlier by Frederik Pohl and other science fiction writers.

=== Explicit and implicit participation ===
Media theorist Mirko Tobias Schäfer made a distinction between explicit and implicit participation in 2011:

- Explicit participation describes the conscious and active engagement of users in fan communities or of developers in creative processes.
- Implicit participation is more subtle and unfolds often without the user's knowledge.

In her 2013 book The Culture of Connectivity, Jose Van Dijck emphasizes the importance of recognizing this distinction in order to thoroughly analyze user agency as a techno-cultural construct.

Dijck (2013) outlines various ways of conceptualizing explicit participation. The first is the statistical conception of user demographics. Websites may "publish facts and figures about their user intensity (e.g., unique monthly users), their national and global user diversity, and relevant demographic facts". For instance, Facebook publishes user demographic data such as gender, age, income, and education level. Explicit participation can also take place on the research end, where an experimental subject interacts with a platform for research purposes.

Dijck (2013) references Leon et al. (2011), giving an example of an experimental study where "a number of users may be selected to perform tasks so researchers can observe their ability to control privacy settings ". Lastly, explicit participation may inform ethnographic data through observational studies, or qualitative interview-based research concerning user habits.

Implicit participation is achieved by implementing user activities into user interfaces and back-end design. Schäfer argues that the success of popular Web 2.0 and social media applications thrives on implicit participation. The notion of implicit participation expands theories of participatory culture as formulated by Henry Jenkins and Axel Bruns, who both focus most prominently on explicit participation. The consideration of implicit participation allows for a more accurate analysis of technology's role in co-shaping user interactions and user-generated content.

=== Textual poachers ===
The term "textual poachers" was originated by Michel de Certeau and has been popularized by Jenkins. Jenkins uses this term to describe how some fans go through content like their favourite movie and engage with the parts that they are interested in, unlike audiences who watch the show more passively and move on to the next thing. Jenkins takes a stand against the stereotypical portrayal of fans as obsessive nerds who are out of touch with reality. He demonstrates that fans are proactive constructors of an alternative culture using elements "poached" and reworked from mass media. Specifically, fans use what they have poached to become producers themselves, creating new cultural materials in a variety of analytical and creative formats from "meta" essays to fanfiction, comics and music. In this way, fans become active participants in the construction and circulation of textual meanings. Fans usually interact with each other through fan groups, fanzines, social events, and even in the case of Trekkers (fans of Star Trek) interact with each other through annual conferences.

In a participatory culture, fans are actively involved in production, which may also influence producer decisions within the medium. Fans interact with each other and try to interact with media producers to express their opinions. Participatory culture transforms the media consumption experience into the production of new texts, cultures, and communities. The result is an autonomous, self-sufficient fan culture.

== Gendered experiences ==
The lack of female representation in participatory culture makes it difficult for women to represent themselves authentically and deters them from participating in participatory culture. The content that is viewed online in participatory situations is biased because of the overrepresentation of male-generated information. With males in dominant positions, "media industries [engage]… existing technologies to break up and reformulate media texts for reasons of their own".

Design intent from the male perspective is a main issue deterring accurate female representation. Females active in participatory culture are at a disadvantage because the content they view is not designed with their participation in mind. Instead of producing male-biased content, "feminist interaction design should seek to bring about political emancipation… it should also force designers to question their own position to assert what an "improved society" is and how to achieve it".

The current interactions and interfaces of participatory culture do not "challenge the hegemonic dominance, legitimacy and appropriateness of positivist epistemologies; theorize from the margins; and problematize gender". Men typically are more involved in the technology industry as "relatively fewer women work in the industry that designs technology now... only in the areas of HCI/usability is the gender balance of workforce anything like equal".

Since technology and design is at the crux of the creation of participatory culture, "much can – and should – be said about who does what, and it is fair to raise the question of whether an industry of men can design for women". "Although the members of the group are not directly teaching or perhaps even indicating the object of… representation, their activities inevitably lead to the exposure of the other individual to that object and this leads to that individual acquiring the same narrow… representations as the other group members have. Social learning of this type (another, similar process is known as local enhancement) has been shown to lead to relatively stable social transmission of behavior over time".

Local enhancement influences audiences to embody and recreate the messages produced in media. Statistically, men actively produce these representations, whereas women do not contribute to the portrayal of women's experiences because of local enhancement online. There is no exact number to determine the precise percentage of female users; surveys taken in 2011 showed slight variation, but all of them reported figures no higher than 15 percent. This shows a large disparity of online users in regards to gender when looking at Wikipedia content. Bias arises as the content presented in Wikipedia seems more male-oriented.

== Promise and potential ==
=== In mass media and civic engagement ===
Participatory culture has been hailed by some as a way to reform communication and enhance the quality of media. According to media scholar Henry Jenkins, one result of the emergence of participatory cultures is an increase in the number of media resources available, giving rise to increased competition between media outlets. Producers of media are forced to pay more attention to the needs of consumers who can turn to other sources for information.

Howard Rheingold and others have argued that the emergence of participatory cultures will enable deep social change. Until as recently as the end of the 20th century, Rheingold argues, a handful of generally privileged, generally wealthy people controlled nearly all forms of mass communication—newspapers, television, magazines, books and encyclopedias. Today, tools for media production and dissemination are readily available and allow for what Rheingold labels "participatory media."

As participation becomes easier, the diversity of voices that can be heard also increases. At one time, only a few mass media giants controlled most of the information that flowed into the homes of the public, but with the advance of technology, one person can spread information around the world. The diversification of media has benefits because in cases where the control of media becomes concentrated, it gives those who have control the ability to influence the opinions and information that flows to the public domain. Media concentration provides opportunity for corruption, but as information becomes accessible from more and more places, it becomes increasingly difficult to control the flow of information to the will of an agenda.

Participatory culture is also seen as a more democratic form of communication, as it stimulates audiences toward active participation because they can help shape the flow of ideas across media formats. The democratic tendency lent to communication by participatory culture allows new models of production that are not based on a hierarchical standard. In the face of increased participation, traditional hierarchies will not disappear, but "Community, collaboration, and self-organization" can become the foundation of corporations as powerful alternatives. Although there may be no real hierarchy evident in many collaborative websites, their ability to form large pools of collective intelligence is not compromised.

=== In civics ===
Participatory culture civics organizations mobilize participatory cultures towards political action. They build on participatory cultures and organize such communities toward civic and political goals. Examples include Harry Potter Alliance, Invisible Children, Inc., and Nerdfighters, which each leverage shared cultural interests to connect and organize members towards explicit political goals. These groups run campaigns by informing, connecting, and eventually organizing their members through new media platforms. Neta Kligler-Vilenchik identified three mechanisms used to translate cultural interests into political outcomes:

1. Tapping shared passion around content worlds and their communities
2. Creative production of content
3. Informal discussion spaces for conversations about salient issues

=== In education ===
Social and participatory media allow for and encourage a shift in how teaching and learning are approached in educational contexts. The increased availability of the Internet in classrooms allows for greater access to information. For example, knowledge can be more de-centralized and made available for everyone. Teachers can then help facilitate efficient and effective means of accessing, interpreting, and making use of that knowledge.

Jenkins believes that participatory culture can play a role in the education of young people as a new form of implicit curriculum. He finds a growing body of academic research showing the potential benefits of formal and informal participatory cultures for the education of young people, including peer-to-peer learning opportunities, the awareness of intellectual property and multiculturalism, cultural expression, the development of skills that are valued in the modern workplace, and a more empowered conception of citizenship.

== Challenges ==
=== In online platforms ===
Rachael Sullivan discusses how some online platforms can be a challenge. According to Rachael Sullivan's book review, she emphasizes on Reddit, and the content used that can be offensive and inappropriate. Memes, GIFs, and other content that users create are negative, and are used primarily for trolling. Reddit has a platform where users in the community can post without restrictions or barriers. This has the potential for backlash against Reddit, as it doesn't restrict content that could be considered offensive or pejorative, and can reflect negatively on the community as a whole. On the other hand, Reddit would likely face similar backlash for restricting what others would consider their right to free speech.

=== For consumers ===
Being a consumer or active contributor is not an attribute of a person, but of a context. Participatory cultures empower people to be active contributors in personally meaningful activities. The drawback of such cultures is that they may force people to cope with the burden of being active contributors in personally irrelevant activities.

This trade-off can be illustrated with the potential and drawbacks of "Do-It-Yourself Societies": starting with self-service restaurants and self-service gas stations a few decades ago, and this trend has been greatly accelerated over the last 10 years. People are empowered through modern tools (including electronic commerce supported by the Web) to do many tasks themselves that were done previously by skilled domain workers serving as agents and intermediaries.

While this shift provides power, freedom, and control to customers (e.g., banking can be done at any time of the day with ATMs, and from any location with the Web), it has led to some less desirable consequences. People may consider some of these tasks not very meaningful personally and therefore would be more than content with a consumer role. Asides from simple tasks that require little to no learning effort, customers lack the experience that professionals have acquired and maintained through the daily use of systems, and the broad background knowledge to do these tasks efficiently and effectively. The tools used to do these tasks — banking, travel reservations, buying airline tickets, checking out groceries at the supermarket — are core technologies for professionals, but occasional technologies for customers.

As businesses increasingly employ participatory practices and resources to market goods and services, consumers who are comfortable working within participatory media are at a distinct advantage over those who are less comfortable. Consumers who are resistant to making use of participatory culture have decreased access to knowledge, goods, and services and are less likely to take advantage of the increased leverage inherent in engaging with businesses as a prosumer.

=== In education ===
The participation gap is linked to the issue of the digital divide, the concern with giving all students access to technology. The movement to break down the digital divide has included efforts to bring computers into classrooms, libraries, and other public places. These efforts have been largely successful, but as Jenkins et al. argue, the concern is now with quality access to available technologies. They explain:

What a person can accomplish with an outdated machine in a public library with mandatory filtering software and no opportunity for storage or transmission pales in comparison to what [a] person can accomplish with a home computer with unfettered Internet access, high band-width, and continuous connectivity.(Current legislation to block access to social networking software in schools and public libraries will further widen the participation gap.) The school system's inability to close this participation gap has negative consequences for everyone involved. On the one hand, those youth who are most advanced in media literacies are often stripped of their technologies and robbed of their best techniques for learning in an effort to ensure a uniform experience for all in the classroom. On the other hand, many youth who have had no exposure to these new kinds of participatory cultures outside school find themselves struggling to keep up with their peers.

— Jenkins et al. pg. 15

Most American youths have at least minimal access to networked computers in educational settings, but children with access to home computers demonstrate more positive attitudes towards computers, show more enthusiasm, and report more enthusiasm and ease when using computers than those who do not. As children with more access to computers become more comfortable with using them, students who are less tech-savvy get pushed aside. Working-class youths may still have access so some technologies (e.g. gaming consoles) while other forms remain unattainable. This inequality would allow certain skills to develop in some children, such as play, while others remain unavailable, such as the ability to produce and distribute self-created media.

The current mindset about learning, teaching, and education is dominated by a view in which teaching is often fitted "into a mold in which a single, presumably omniscient teacher explicitly tells or shows presumably unknowing learners something they presumably know nothing about". Instead of serving as the "reproductive organ of a consumer society", educational institutions can promote the development of active contributor mindsets by creating habits, tools and skills that help people become empowered and willing to actively contribute to the design of their lives and communities.

=== A new form of literacy ===
Jenkins et al. believes that conversation surrounding the digital divide should focus on opportunities to participate and to develop the cultural competencies and social skills required to take part rather than get stuck on the question of technological access. As institutions, schools have been slow on the uptake of participatory culture. Instead, afterschool programs currently devote more attention to the development of new media literacies, or, a set of cultural competencies and social skills that have become necessary for young people. Participatory culture shifts this literacy from the individual level to community involvement. Networking and collaboration develop social skills that are vital to the new literacies. Although new, these skills build on an existing foundation of traditional literacy, research skills, technical skills, and critical analysis skills taught in classroom settings.

== Meta-design ==
Metadesign is "design for designers". It represents an emerging conceptual framework aimed at defining and creating social and technical infrastructure in which participatory cultures can thrive and new forms of collaborative design can take place. It extends the traditional notion of system design beyond the original development of a system to allow users to become co-designers and co-developers. It is grounded in the basic assumption that future uses and problems cannot be completely anticipated while a system is in development. Users will discover mismatches between their needs and the support that an existing system can provide for them. These mismatches will lead to breakdowns that serve as potential sources of new insights, new knowledge, and new understanding.

Meta-design supports participatory cultures as follows:

1. Making changes must seem possible: Contributors should not be intimidated and should not have the impression that they are incapable of making changes; the more users become convinced that changes are not as difficult as they think they are, the more they may be willing to participate.
2. Changes must be technically feasible: If a system is closed, then contributors cannot make any changes; as a necessary prerequisite, there needs to be possibilities and mechanisms for extension.
3. Benefits must be perceived: Contributors have to believe that what they get in return justifies the investment they make. The benefits perceived may vary and can include professional benefits (helping for one's own work), social benefits (increased status in a community, possibilities for jobs), and personal benefits (engaging in fun activities).
4. The environments must support tasks that people engage in: The best environments will not succeed if they are focused on activities that people do rarely or consider of marginal value.
5. Low barriers must exist to sharing changes: Evolutionary growth is greatly accelerated in systems in which participants can share changes and keep track of multiple versions easily. If sharing is difficult, it creates an unnecessary burden that participants are unwilling to overcome.

== See also ==
- Affinity space
- Constructed world
- Consumtariat
- Culture of Peace
- Derpy Hooves
- Digital rhetoric
- Hypersociability
- Participatory democracy
- Prosumer
- Public participation
- Remix culture
- The Long Tail
- Transmedia storytelling
