= Collective farming =

Type of agricultural organization

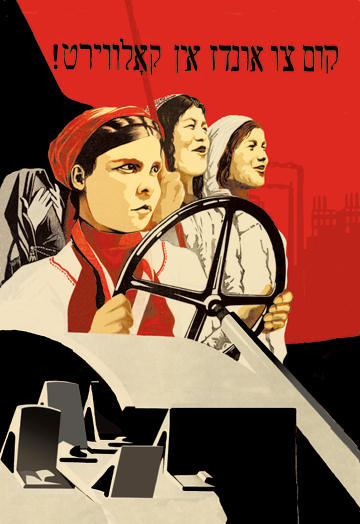
"Drive to the Collective Farm!" – 1920s Yiddish-language poster featuring women kolkhoz workers

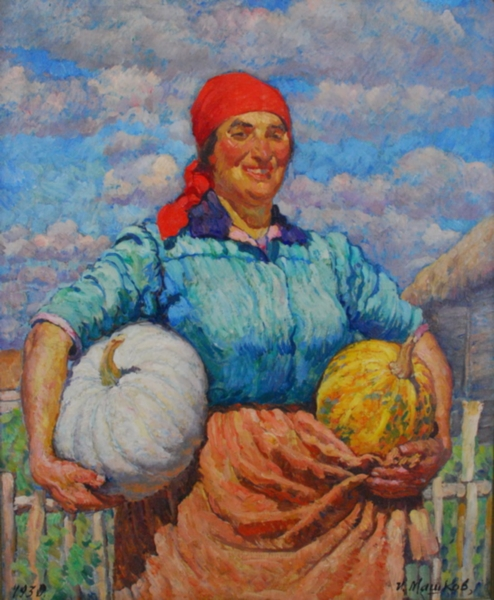
"Kolkhoz-woman with pumpkins", 1930 painting

Collective farming and communal farming are various types of agricultural production in which multiple farmers run their holdings as a joint enterprise. Two broad types of communal farms exist: agricultural cooperatives, in which member-owners jointly engage in farming activities as a collective; and state farms, which are owned and directly run by a centralized government. The process by which farmland is aggregated is called collectivization.

== Pre-20th-century history ==
=== Mexico ===
Under the Aztec Empire, central Mexico was divided into small territories called calpulli, which were units of local administration concerned with farming as well as education and religion. A calpulli consisted of a number of large extended families with a presumed common ancestor, themselves each composed of a number of nuclear families. Each calpulli owned the land and granted the individual families the right to farm parts of it each day. When the Spanish conquered Mexico they replaced this with a system of estates granted by the Spanish crown to Spanish colonists, as well as the encomienda, a feudal-like right of overlordship colonists were given in particular villages, and the repartimiento or system of indigenous forced labor.

Following the Mexican Revolution, a new constitution in 1917 abolished any remnant of feudal-like rights hacienda owners had over common lands and offered the development of ejidos: communal farms formed on land purchased from the large estates by the Mexican government.

=== Early modern North America ===
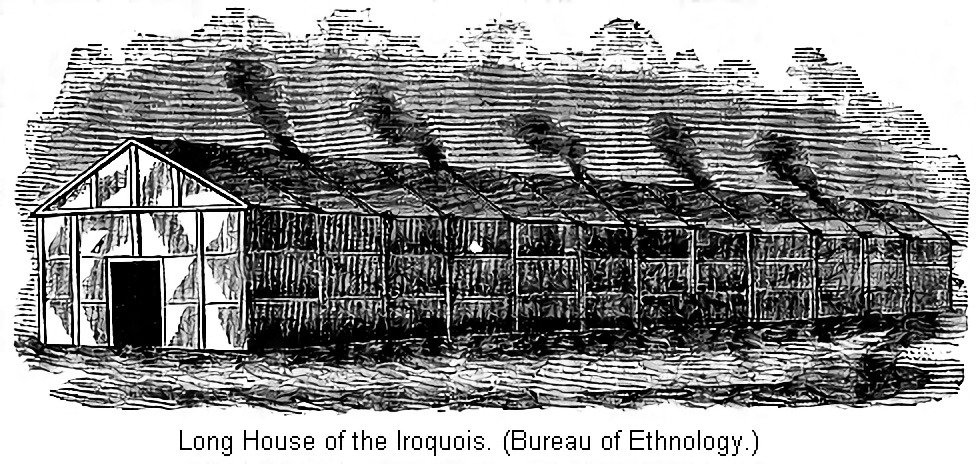
A Haudenosaunee longhouse capable of housing several hundred people

The Wendat had an essentially communal system of land ownership. The French Catholic missionary Gabriel Sagard described the fundamentals, noting the Wendat had "as much land as they need[ed]." As a result, the Wendat system could give families their own land and still have a large amount of excess land owned communally. Any Wendat was free to clear the land and farm on the basis of usufruct. They maintained possession of the land as long as they continued to actively cultivate and tend the fields. Once they abandoned the land, it reverted to communal ownership, and anyone could take it up for themselves. While the Wendat did seem to have lands designated for the individual, the significance of this possession may be of little relevance; the placement of corn storage vessels in longhouses, which contained multiple families in one kinship group, suggests the occupants of a given longhouse held all production in common.

The Haudenosaunee had a similar communal system of land distribution. The tribe owned all lands but gave out tracts to the different clans for further distribution among households for cultivation. The land would be redistributed among the households every few years, and a clan could request a redistribution of tracts when the Clan Mothers' Council gathered. Those clans that abused their allocated land or otherwise did not take care of it would be warned and eventually punished by the Clan Mothers' Council by having the land redistributed to another clan. Land property was really only the concern of the women, since cultivating food was the women's job and not the men's. The Clan Mothers' Council also reserved certain areas of land to be worked by the women of all the different clans. Food from such lands, called kěndiǔ"gwǎ'ge' hodi'yěn'tho, would be used at festivals and large council gatherings.

=== Russian Empire ===
The obshchina (Russian: общи́на, IPA: [ɐpˈɕːinə], literally: "commune") or mir (Russian: мир, literally: "society" (one of the meanings)) or Selskoye obshestvo (Russian: сельское общество ("Rural community", official term in the 19th and 20th century) were peasant communities, as opposed to individual farmsteads, or khutors, in Imperial Russia. The term derives from the word о́бщий, obshchiy (common).

The vast majority of Russian peasants held their land in communal ownership within a mir community, which acted as a village government and a cooperative. Arable land was divided into sections based on soil quality and distance from the village. Each household had the right to claim one or more strips from each section depending on the number of adults in the household. The purpose of this allocation was not so much social (providing to each according to their needs) as it was practical (ensuring that each person pay their taxes). Strips were periodically reallocated on the basis of a census, to ensure equitable share of the land. This reallocation was enforced by the state, which had an interest in the households' ability to pay their taxes.

== Collectivization under state socialism ==
The Soviet Union introduced collective farming in its constituent republics between 1927 and 1933. The Baltic states and most of the Eastern Bloc (except Poland) adopted collective farming after World War II, with the accession of communist regimes to power. In Asia (People's Republic of China, North Korea, Laos, and Vietnam) the adoption of collective farming was also driven by communist government policies.

=== Soviet Union ===
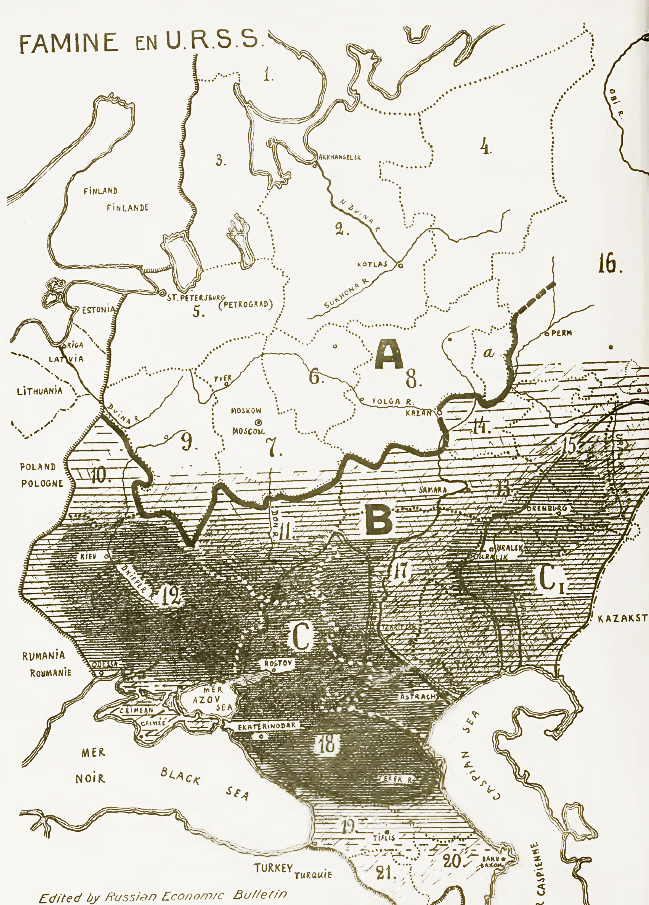
Soviet famine of 1932–33. Areas of most disastrous famine marked with black.

Leon Trotsky and the opposition bloc had originally advocated a programme of industrialization which also proposed agricultural cooperatives and the formation of collective farms on a voluntary basis. According to Sheila Fitzpatrick, the scholarly consensus was that Joseph Stalin appropriated the position of the left opposition on such matters as industrialisation and collectivisation. Other scholars have argued the economic programme of Trotsky of voluntary collectivisation differed from the policy of forced collectivisation implemented by Stalin after 1928, due to the levels of brutality associated with the latter’s enforcement.

As part of the first five-year plan, forced collectivization was introduced in the Soviet Union by Stalin in the late 1920s as a way, according to the policies of socialist leaders, to boost agricultural production through the organization of land and labor into large-scale collective farms (kolkhozy). At the same time, Stalin argued that collectivization would free poor peasants from economic servitude under the kulaks (farmland owners). In what became known as dekulakization, defiant kulaks were executed or mass deported to Siberia by the Soviet Communist Party in order to implement the plan.

The centuries-old system of farming was destroyed in Ukraine. In 1932–1933, it is estimated that 5.7 to 8.7 million people, about half of whom were Ukrainian, died from famine after Stalin forced the peasants into collectives. It was not until 1940 that agricultural production finally surpassed its pre-collectivization levels.

Collectivization throughout the Moldavian Soviet Socialist Republic was not aggressively pursued until the early 1960s because of the Soviet leadership's focus on a policy of Russification of Moldavians into the Russian way of life. Much of the collectivization in Moldova had undergone in Transnistria, in Chişinău, the present-day capital city of Moldova. Most of the directors who regulated and conducted the process of collectivization were placed by officials from Moscow.

The efficiency of collective farms in the USSR is debatable. A Soviet article in March 1975 found that 27% of the total value of Soviet agricultural produce was produced by privately farmed plots despite the fact that they only consisted of less than 1% of arable land (approximately 20 million acres), making them roughly 40 times more efficient than collective farms. In 1935, the establishment of Personal Subsidiary Farms on collective land was allowed in the range of .25-1 hectare. Private cattle ownership existed after 1935 but was severely restricted by decree in 1956.

=== Romania ===
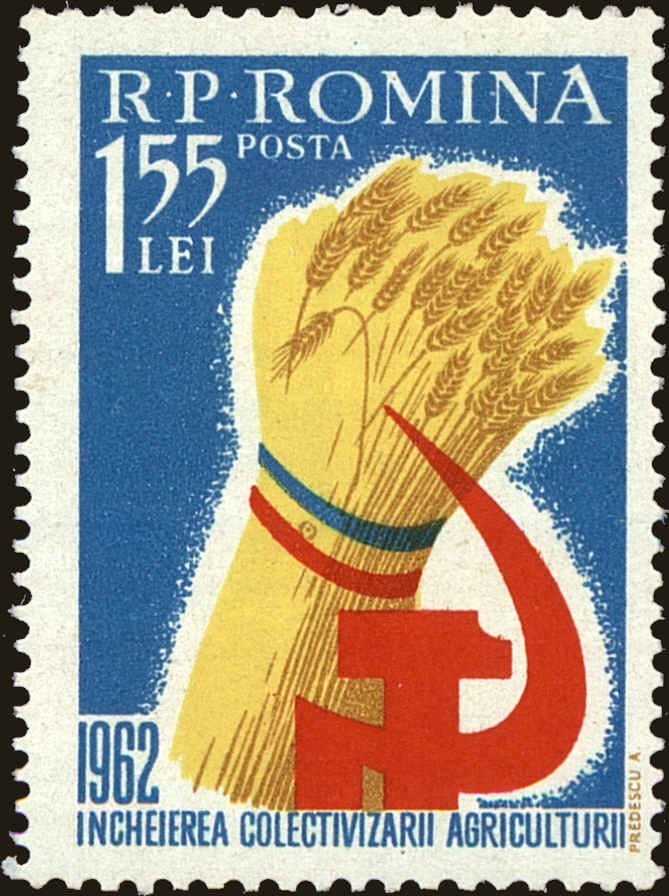
1962 stamp commemorating the "completion" of land collectivization

In Romania, land collectivization began in 1948 and continued for over more than a decade until its virtual completion in 1962. Force sometimes had to be used to enforce collective agricultural practices. Collective farming in Romania was an attempt to implement the USSR's communist blueprint. These attempts often fell short. By strictly adhering to this Soviet blueprint, the implementation of communism in Romania inevitably created dilemmas and contradictions that led to violence. Kligman and Verdery state "The violence collectivization, emerges then, less, as an abhoration than as a product of sociocultural shaping and of deep problems with how the soviet blueprint came to be implemented... instead of a gradual and integrated process of moving from one form of society to another, Romanian society in the Soviet orbit was being completely rearticulated, a process in which violence was inevitable."

On the other hand, as Kligman and Verdery explain, "Collectivization brought undeniable benefits to some rural inhabitants, especially those who had owned little or no land. It freed them from laboring on the fields of others, and it increased their control over wages, lending to their daily existence a stability previously unknown to them."

=== Bulgaria ===
Collective farms in the People's Republic of Bulgaria, introduced in 1945, were called Labour Cooperative Agricultural Farm (Bulgarian: Трудово кооперативно земеделско стопанство, romanized: Trudovo kooperativno zemedelsko stopanstvo).

=== Hungary ===
In Hungary, agricultural collectivization was attempted several times between 1948 and 1956, with disastrous results, until it was finally successful in the early 1960s under János Kádár. The first serious attempt at collectivization based on Stalinist agricultural policy was undertaken in July 1948. Both economic and direct police pressure were used to coerce peasants to join cooperatives, but large numbers opted instead to leave their villages. By the early 1950s, only one-quarter of peasants had agreed to join cooperatives.

In the spring of 1955 the drive for collectivization was renewed, again using physical force to encourage membership, but this second wave also ended in dismal failure. After the events of the 1956 Hungarian Revolution, the ruling Hungarian Socialist Workers' Party opted for a more gradual collectivization drive. The main wave of collectivization occurred between 1959 and 1961, and at the end of this period more than 95% of agricultural land in Hungary had become the property of collective farms. In February 1961, the Central Committee declared that collectivization had been completed.

=== Czechoslovakia ===
In Czechoslovakia, centralized land reforms after World War I allowed for the distribution of most of the land to peasants and the poor, and created large groups of relatively well-to-do farmers (though village poor still existed). These groups showed no support for communist ideals. In 1945, immediately after World War II, new land reform started with the new socialist government. The first phase involved a confiscation of properties of Germans, Hungarians, and collaborators with the Nazi regime in accordance with the so-called Beneš decrees. The second phase, promulgated by so-called Ďuriš's laws (after the Communist Minister of Agriculture), in fact meant a complete revision of the pre-war land reform and tried to reduce maximal private property to 150 hectares (370 acres) of agricultural land and 250 hectares (620 acres) of any land.

The third and final phase forbade possession of land above 50 hectares (120 acres) for one family. This phase was carried out in April 1948, two months after the Communist Party of Czechoslovakia took power by force. Farms started to be collectivized, mostly under the threat of sanctions. The most obstinate farmers were persecuted and imprisoned. The most common form of collectivization was agricultural cooperative (Czech: Jednotné zemědělské družstvo, JZD; Slovak: Jednotné roľnícke družstvo, JRD). The collectivization was implemented in three stages (1949–1952, 1953–1956, 1956–1969) and officially ended with the 1960 implementation of the constitution establishing the Czechoslovak Socialist Republic, which made private ownership illegal.

Many early cooperatives collapsed and were recreated. Their productivity was low since they provided tiny salaries and no pensions, and they failed to create a sense of collective ownership; small-scale pilfering was common, and food became scarce. Seeing the massive outflow of people from agriculture into cities, the government started to massively subsidize the cooperatives in order to make the standard of living of farmers equal to that of city inhabitants; this was the long-term official policy of the government. Funds, machinery, and fertilizers were provided; young people from villages were forced to study agriculture; and students were regularly sent (involuntarily) to help in cooperatives.

Subsidies and constant pressure destroyed the remaining private farmers; only a handful of them remained after the 1960s. The lifestyle of villagers had eventually reached the level of cities, and village poverty was eliminated. Czechoslovakia was again able to produce enough food for its citizens. The price of this success was a huge waste of resources because the cooperatives had no incentive to improve efficiency. Every piece of land was cultivated regardless of the expense involved, and the soil became heavily polluted with chemicals. Also, the intensive use of heavy machinery damaged topsoil. Furthermore, the cooperatives were infamous for over-employment.

In the late 1970s, the economy of Czechoslovakia entered into stagnation, and the state-owned companies were unable to deal with advent of modern technologies. A few agricultural companies (where the rules were less strict than in state companies) used this situation to start providing high-tech products. For example, the only way to buy a PC-compatible computer in the late 1980s was to get it (for an extremely high price) from one agricultural company acting as a reseller.

After the fall of communism in Czechoslovakia in 1989 subsidies to agriculture were halted with devastating effect. Most of the cooperatives had problems competing with technologically advanced foreign competition and were unable to obtain investment to improve their situation. Quite a large percentage of them collapsed. The others that remained were typically insufficiently funded, lacking competent management, without new machinery and living from day to day. Employment in the agricultural sector dropped significantly (from approximately 25% of the population to approximately 1%).

=== East Germany ===
Collective farms in the German Democratic Republic were typically called Landwirtschaftliche Produktionsgenossenschaft (LPG), and corresponded closely to the Soviet kolkhoz. East Germany also had a few state-owned farms which were equivalent to the Soviet sovkhoz, which were called the Volkseigenes Gut (VEG). The structure of farms in what was called East Elbia until German partition was dominated by latifundia, and thus the land reform which was justified on denazification grounds and with the aim of destroying the Prussian Junker class – which had been hated by the left during the Weimar Republic and which was blamed for Prussian militarism and the authoritarian tendencies of the German Empire and later Nazi Germany – was initially popular with many small farmers and landless peasants. East German President Wilhelm Pieck coined the slogan Junkerland in Bauernhand! ("Junker land into farmer's hand!") to promote land reform, which was initially pledged to be more moderate than full-scale collectivization. Although the ruling Socialist Unity Party and the Soviet Military Administration in Germany promised to allow large landowners to keep their land, they were expelled as the LPG were introduced in 1953. After 1959 all farmers were required to surrender independently owned land and join the LPGs. Similarly to the Soviet Union, ultimately most of the land was transferred into de jure or de facto state controlled entities with the former farmers becoming employees – now of the state instead of the erstwhile Junker class.

=== Poland ===
The Polish name of a collective farm was rolnicza spółdzielnia produkcyjna, 'agricultural production cooperative'. Collectivisation in Poland was stopped in 1956; later, nationalisation was supported.

=== Yugoslavia ===
Collective farming was introduced as a League of Communists of Yugoslavia government policy throughout the Socialist Federal Republic of Yugoslavia after World War II, by taking away land from wealthy pre-war owners and limiting possessions in private ownership first to 25, and later to 10 hectares. The large, state-owned farms were known as "Agricultural cooperatives" (zemljoradničke zadruge in Serbo-Croatian) and farmers working on them had to meet production quotas in order to satisfy the needs of the populace. This system was largely abolished in the 1950s. See: Law of 23 August 1945 with amendments until 1 December 1948.

=== China ===
At the end of the Land Reform movement, individual families in China owned the land they farmed, paid taxes as households, and sold grain at prices set by the state. Rural collectivization began soon after the CCP announced its 1953 "general line for the transition to socialism". Over the next six years, collectivization took several incrementally progressing forms: mutual aid groups, primitive cooperatives, and people's communes. As London School of Economics and Political Science Professor Lin Chun notes, researchers agree that communization proceeded on a largely voluntary basis that avoided both the violence and sabotage that occurred during the Soviet collectivization. Like Professor Barry Naughton, she observes that China's collectivization proceeded smoothly in part because, unlike the Soviet experience, a network of state institutions already existed in the countryside. Similarly, Professor Edward Friedman describes China's collectivization process as a "miracle of miracles".

During 1954–1955, farmers in many areas began pooling their land, capital resources, and labor into beginning-level agricultural producers' cooperatives (chuji nongye hezuoshe). In the complex system of beginning-level agricultural producers' cooperatives, farmers received a share of the harvest based on a combination of how much labor and how much land they contributed to the cooperative.

By June 1956, over 60% of rural households had been collectivized into higher-level agricultural producers' cooperatives (gaoji nongye hezuoshe), a structure that was similar to Soviet collective farmering via kolkhozy. In these cooperatives, tens of households pooled land and draft animals. Adult members of the cooperative were credited with work points based on how much labor they had provided at which tasks. At the end of the year, the collective deducted taxes and fixed-price sales to the state, and the cooperative retained seed for the next year as well as some investment and welfare funds. The collective then distributed to the households the remainder of the harvest and some of the money received from sales to the state. The distribution was based partly on work points accrued by the adult members of a household, and partly at a standard rate by age and sex. These cooperatives also lent small amounts of land back to households individually on which the households could grow crops to consume directly or sell at market. Apart from the large-scale communization during the Great Leap Forward, higher-level agricultural producers' collective were generally the dominant form of rural collectivization in China.

During the Great Leap Forward, the Mao Zedong-led Communist Party rapidly converted the Chinese economy to a socialist society through rapid industrialization and large scale collectivization. Later, the country was hit by massive floods and droughts. This, combined with the usage of severely flawed policies of Lysenkoism and the Four Pests Campaign, caused "The Great Chinese Famine of 1959," where nearly 30 million people died of hunger. The party officially blamed floods and droughts for the famine; however, it was clear to the party members at the party meetings that famine was caused mostly by their own policies. Recent studies also demonstrate that it was career incentives within the politburo system as well as political radicalism that led to the great famine.

Collectivization of land via the commune system facilitated China's rapid industrialization through the state's control of food production and procurement. This allowed the state to accelerate the process of capital accumulation, ultimately laying the successful foundation of physical and human capital for the economic growth of China's reform and opening up. During the early and middle 1950s, collectivization was an important factor in the major change in Chinese agriculture during that period, the dramatic increase in irrigated land. For example, collectivization was a factor that contributed to the introduction of double cropping in the south, a labor-intensive process which greatly increased agricultural yields.

Both land reform movement and collectivization largely left in place the social systems in the ethnic minority group areas of Chinese Central Asia and Zomia. These areas generally underwent collectivization in the form of agricultural producers' cooperatives during winter of 1957 through 1958, having skipped the small peasant landholder stage that had followed land reform elsewhere in China. Central Tibet was under the joint administration of the People's Liberation Army and the Dalai Lama's theocracy until 1959, and consequently did not experience land reform or collectivization until 1960 in agricultural areas and 1966 in pastoral areas.

After the death of Mao Zedong, Deng Xiaoping reformed the collective farming method. From this time, nearly all Chinese crops began to blossom, not just grain. The reform included the removal of land from rich land owners for use of agricultural land for peasants, but not ownership. This policy increased production and helped reverse the effects of The Great Leap Forward. The two main reasons why China succeeded was because 1) the government chose to make gradual changes, which kept the monopoly of the Chinese Communist Party and 2) because the reform process began from the bottom and later expanded to the top. Throughout the reform process, the Communist Party reacted positively to the bottom-up reform initiatives that emerged from the rural population. Deng Xiaoping described the reform process as "fording the river by feeling for the stones". This statement refers to the Chinese people who called for the reforms they wanted by "placing the stones at his feet" and he would then just approve the reforms the people wanted. The peasants started their own "household responsibility system" apart from the government. After Chinese trade was privately deemed successful, all Deng had to do was approve its legalization. This increased competition between farmers domestically and internationally, meaning the low wage working class began to be known worldwide, increasing the Chinese FDI.

A 2017 study found that Chinese peasants slaughtered massive numbers of draft animals as a response to collectivization, as this would allow them to keep the meat and hide, and not transfer the draft animals to the collectives. The study estimates that "the animal loss during the movement was 12 to 15 percent, or 7.4–9.5 million dead. Grain output dropped by 7 percent due to lower animal inputs and lower productivity."

=== North Korea ===
In the late 1990s, the collective farming system collapsed under a strain of droughts. Estimates of deaths due to starvation ranged into the millions, although the government did not allow outside observers to survey the extent of the famine. Aggravating the severity of the famine, the government was accused of diverting international relief supplies to its armed forces. Agriculture in North Korea has suffered tremendously from natural disasters, a lack of fertile land, and government mismanagement, often causing the nation to rely on foreign aid as its primary source of food.

=== Vietnam ===
The Democratic Republic of Vietnam implemented collective farming although de jure private ownership existed. Starting in 1958 collective farming was pushed such that by 1960, 85% of farmers and 70% of farmlands were collectivized including those seized by force. Collectivization however was seen by the communist leadership as a half-measure when compared to full state ownership.

Following the Fall of Saigon on 30 April 1975, South Vietnam briefly came under the authority of a Provisional Revolutionary Government, a puppet state under military occupation by North Vietnam, before being officially reunified with the North under Communist rule as the Socialist Republic of Vietnam on 2 July 1976. Upon taking control, the Vietnamese communists banned other political parties, arrested suspects believed to have collaborated with the United States and embarked on a mass campaign of collectivization of farms and factories. Private land ownership was "transformed" to subsume under State and collective ownership. Reconstruction of the war-ravaged country was slow and serious humanitarian and economic problems confronted the communist regime.

In an historic shift in 1986, the Communist Party of Vietnam implemented free-market reforms known as Đổi Mới (Renovation). With the authority of the state remaining unchallenged, private enterprise, deregulation and foreign investment were encouraged. Land ownership nonetheless is the sole prerogative of the state. The economy of Vietnam has achieved rapid growth in agricultural and industrial production, construction and housing, exports and foreign investment. However, the power of the Communist Party of Vietnam over all organs of government remains firm, preventing full land ownership. Conflicts between the state and private farmers over land rights have grown with the potential to spark social and political instability.

Despite the reforms however, over 50% of all farms in Vietnam remain collective cooperatives (over 15,000 farming cooperatives in Vietnam), and almost all farmers being members of some kind of cooperative. The state also heavily encourages collective cooperative farming over private farming.

=== Cuba ===
In the initial years that followed the Cuban Revolution, government authorities experimented with agricultural and farming production cooperatives. Between 1977 and 1983, farmers began to collectivize into CPAs – Cooperativa de Producción Agropecuaria (Agricultural Production Cooperatives). Farmers were encouraged to sell their land to the state for the establishment of a cooperative farm, receiving payments for a period of 20 years while also sharing in the fruits of the CPA. Joining a CPA allowed individuals who were previously dispersed throughout the countryside to move to a centralized location with increased access to electricity, medical care, housing, and schools. Democratic practice tends to be limited to business decisions and is constrained by the centralized economic planning of the Cuban system.

Another type of agricultural production cooperative in Cuba is UBPC – Unidad Básica de Producción Cooperativa (Basic Unit of Cooperative Production). The law authorizing the creation of UBPCs was passed on 20 September 1993. It has been used to transform many state farms into UBPCs, similar to the transformation of Russian sovkhozes (state farms) into kolkhozes (collective farms) since 1992. The law granted indefinite usufruct to the workers of the UBPC in line with its goal of linking the workers to the land. It established material incentives for increased production by tying workers' earnings to the overall production of the UBPC, and increased managerial autonomy and workers' participation in the management of the workplace.

=== Tanzania ===
The Tanzanian socialist approach of ujamaa supported by President Julius Nyerere focused on collectivizing ownership of property and communal organization of agriculture in the Tanzanian countryside. This re-organization of the countryside began on a voluntary and experimental basis. From 1973 to 1975, these goals were pursued through the forced villagization process of Operation Vijiji.

== Other collective farming ==
=== Europe ===
In the European Union, cooperative farming, farmers own their land privately, farms are independent family businesses and cooperation happens mainly in processing, marketing, exporting and purchasing inputs; is fairly common and agricultural cooperatives hold a 40% market share among the 27 member states. In the Netherlands, cooperative agriculture holds a market share of approximately 70%, second only to Finland. In France, cooperative agriculture represents 40% of the national food industry's production and nearly 90 Billion € in gross revenue, covering one out of three food brands in the country.

There are also intentional communities which practice collective agriculture. There is a growing number of community supported agriculture initiatives, some of which operate under consumer/worker governance, that could be considered collective farms.

=== India ===
In Indian villages a single field (normally a plot of three to five acres) may be farmed collectively by the villagers, who each offer labour as a devotional offering, possibly for one or two days per cropping season. The resulting crop belongs to no one individual, and is used as an offering. The labour input is the offering of the peasant in their role as priests. The wealth generated by the sale of the produce belongs to the Gods and hence is Apaurusheya or impersonal. Shrambhakti (labour contributed as devotional offering) is the key instrument for generation of internal resources. The benefits of the harvest are most often redistributed in the village for common good as well as individual need – not as loan or charity, but as divine grace (prasad). The recipient is under no obligation to repay it and no interest need be paid on such gifts.

=== Israel ===
Collective farming was also implemented in kibbutzim in Israel, which began in 1909 as a unique combination of Zionism and socialism known as Labor Zionism. The concept has faced occasional criticism as economically inefficient and over-reliant on subsidized credit.

A lesser-known type of collective farm in Israel is moshav shitufi (lit. collective settlement), where production and services are managed collectively, as in a kibbutz, but consumption decisions are left to individual households. In terms of cooperative organization, moshav shitufi is distinct from the much more common moshav (or moshav ovdim), essentially a village-level service cooperative, not a collective farm.

In 2006 there were 40 moshavim shitufi'im in Israel, compared with 267 kibbutzim.

Collective farming in Israel differs from collectivism in communist states in that it is voluntary. However, including moshavim, various forms of collective farming have traditionally been and remain the primary agricultural model, as there are only a small number of completely private farms in Israel outside of the moshavim.

=== Mexico ===
In Mexico the Ejido system provided poor farmers with collective use rights to agricultural land.

=== Canada and United States ===
The Anabaptist Hutterites have farmed communally since the 16th century. Most of them now live on the Canadian Prairies and the northern Great Plains of the United States, as well as in Southern Ontario in Canada.

Until recently Western Canada had a centralised wheat board where farmers were usually obligated to sell their wheat to the province which sold the product at a high collective price. Ontario currently has a milk board which obliges most milk producers to sell their milk to the province at a regulated quality and price.

A movement of voluntary collective farming started in 2008 in the Research Triangle under the name of crop mob. The idea spread throughout the United States and less than 10 years later this particular type of incidental, spontaneous, social-media driven collective farming was reported in over 70 places.

== In popular culture ==
In the 2021 Telugu film Sreekaram, the main protagonist encourages people for a community farming.

The 1929 Soviet film The General Line features Martha and a group of peasants organizing a kolkhoz. The film began production as a promotion of the Trotskyist Left Opposition viewpoint on collectivization. After the rise of Joseph Stalin and expulsion of his rival Leon Trotsky, it was heavily re-edited into the pro-Stalinist film The Old and the New.

The 1930 Soviet Ukrainian film Earth features a peasant encouraging his village in the Ukrainian Soviet Socialist Republic to embrace collectivization, which they do after he is killed by kulaks.

== See also ==
- Camphill Movement – Special education
- Dekulakization – 1929–1932 Soviet repression of peasants
- Work unit – State institution of employment and political organization in China
