= Litowa, Tanzania =

Litowa
- Village
- Country: Tanzania
- Region: Ruvuma Region

Litowa is a village in Tanzania which served as a testing ground for Julius Nyerere's vision of Ujamaa. Located near Mbeya, Litowa was "the first Ujamaa village", and attracted attention during Nyerere's campaign for achieving "agricultural development within communal forms of production", and was upheld by Nyerere himself "as a practical example of ujamaa where I can send people to see it in practice".

== Ujamaa village ==
The concept of an Ujamaa village in Litowa was first devised in November 1960, when a group of locals, who did not want to travel to the country's coastal areas for work, attempted to create a sisal estate in the village. This effort failed at first, due to wild animals and an insufficient food supply. However, the next year, the locals tried again, with support of a local TANU party secretary, who cleared the way by resolving a land dispute, and a man from Southern Rhodesia with experience in cooperative farming. Locals began a communal plot in nearly Njoomlole, but continued to live in Litowa.

The village shortly began seeing success. In 1962, the villagers began constructing new houses, and invited their relatives to join the village.

=== Government ===
Litowa began holding village elections around 1962, electing a chairman, manager, a secretary-treasurer, and nine management committee members. Members of the management committee would serve three year terms.

=== Education ===
Litowa was one of the villages that attempted Nyere's rural development and education reforms, which aimed to "educate the children to stay in these communities and carry on the work their parents have begun" through primary education designed to help students prepare for a rural communal life, as opposed to advancing towards secondary school. Litowa's school, first established in 1963, was self-governing, and attracted pupils from other villages, who boarded in Litowa to school. According to a 1968 article written by an instructor at the school, the village's school enrolled 245 students. Curriculum in the school included construction activities, farm work, animal husbandry, nursing, and craft skills such as spinning and weaving. Pupils at Litowa's school were also asked with forming their own decision-making committee, studied politics, and held seminars.

=== Evaluation ===
One American professor who researched the village called Litowa's model "participatory democracy" and "a form of progressive education", and likened it to Amish and Hutterite communities, and the vision of Mahatma Gandhi. Multiple researchers have compared Litowa to kibbutzim.

=== Reception ===
Neighboring villages began sending delegations to visit Litowa and ask for advice. In response, village officials collaborated with a regional commissioner to create the Ruvuma Development Association in 1963. Around this time, governing officials in neighboring districts would invoke the example of Litowa to try to stimulate peasants, but often failed due to general apathy.

President Julius Nyerere visited Litowa in 1965, and praised it as an example of Ujamaa. That same year, the main leader of Litowa was elected to the National Assembly of Tanzania.

== See also ==
- African socialism
- Agrarian socialism
- Julius Nyerere
- Kibbutz
- Ujamaa
- Utopian socialism
