= Smart mob =

Digital-communication coordinated group

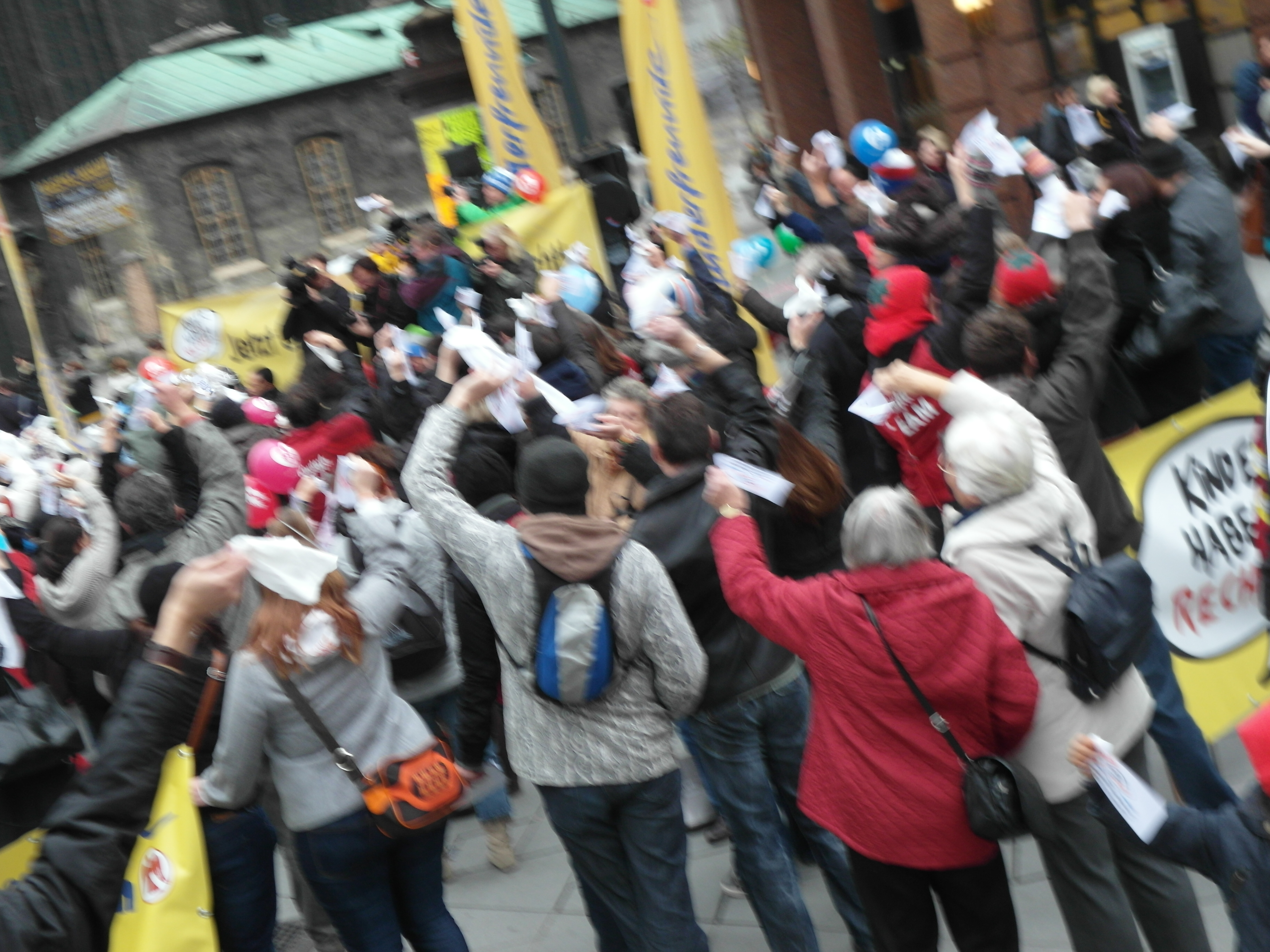
Smart mob on the occasion of United Nations Children's Day, Vienna, Austria, November 20, 2010

A smart mob is a group whose coordination and communication abilities have been empowered by digital communication technologies. Smart mobs are particularly known for their ability to mobilize quickly.

The concept was introduced by Howard Rheingold in his 2002 book Smart Mobs: The Next Social Revolution. Rheingold defined the smart mob as follows: "Smart mobs consist of people who are able to act in concert even if they don’t know each other... because they carry devices that possess both communication and computing capabilities". In December of that year, the "smart mob" concept was highlighted in the New York Times "Year in Ideas".

== Characteristics ==
These technologies that empower smart mobs include the Internet, computer-mediated communication such as Internet Relay Chat, and Wireless devices like mobile phones and personal digital assistants. Methodologies like peer-to-peer networks and ubiquitous computing are also changing the ways in which people organize and share information.

Flash mobs are a specific form of smart mob, originally describing a group of people who assemble suddenly in a public place, do something unusual and pointless for a brief period of time, then quickly disperse. The difference between flash and smart mobs is primarily with regards to their duration: flash mobs disappear quickly, but smart mobs can have a more enduring presence. The term flash mob is claimed to have been inspired by "smart mob".

Smart mobs have begun to have an impact in current events, as mobile phones and text messages have empowered everyone from revolutionaries in Malaysia to individuals protesting the second Iraq War. Individuals who have divergent worldviews and methods have been able to coordinate short-term.

A 2009 entry in the Encyclopedia of Computer Science and Technology noted that the term may be "fading from public use".

== Early instances ==
A forerunner to the idea can be found in the work of anarchist thinker Kropotkin, "fishermen, hunters, travelling merchants, builders, or settled craftsmen came together for a common pursuit."

According to CNN, the first smart mobs were teenage "thumb tribes" in Tokyo and Helsinki who used text messaging on cell phones to organize impromptu raves or to stalk celebrities. For instance, in Tokyo, crowds of teenage fans would assemble seemingly spontaneously at subway stops where a rock musician was rumored to be headed.

However, an even earlier example is the Dîner en blanc phenomenon, which has taken place annually in Paris, France, since 1988, for one night around the end of June. The invited guests wear only white clothes and gather at a chosen spot, knowledge of which they have only a short time beforehand. They bring along food, drink, chairs and a table and the whole group then gathers to have a meal, after which they disperse. The event has been held each year in different places in the centre of Paris. It is not a normal cultural event because it is not advertised and only those who have received an invite attend—information on the chosen location is transferred by text message or more recently Twitter. The number of people attending has grown, in 2011, to over 10,000. Dîner en blanc would be considered a smart mob rather than a flash mob, because the event lasts for several hours.

The Professional Contractors Group organised the first smart mob in the UK in 2000 when 700 contractors turned up at The House of Commons to lobby their MP following an email sent out a few days before.

In the days after the U.S. presidential election of 2000, online activist Zack Exley anonymously created a website that allowed people to suggest locations for gatherings to protest for a full recount of the votes in Florida. On the first Saturday after the election, more than 100 significant protests took place—many with thousands of participants—without any traditional organizing effort. Exley wrote in December 2000 that the self-organized protests "demonstrated that a fundamental change is taking place in our national political life. It's not the Internet per se, but the emerging potential for any individual to communicate—for free and anonymously if necessary—with any other individual."

In the Philippines in 2001, a group of protesters organized via text messaging gathered at the EDSA Shrine, the site of the 1986 revolution that overthrew Ferdinand Marcos, to protest the corruption of President Joseph Estrada. The protest grew quickly, and Estrada was soon removed from office.

The Critical Mass bicycling events, dating back to 1992, are also sometimes compared to smart mobs, due to their self-organizing manner of assembly.

== Examples ==
Essentially, the smart mob is a practical implementation of collective intelligence. According to Rheingold, examples of smart mobs are the street protests organized by the anti-globalization movement. The Free State Project has been described in Foreign Policy as an example of potential "smart mob rule". Other examples of smart mobs include:

- Smart mobs who arrange the meet up over the internet and show up at a retailer at a specific time and use their number to negotiate a discount with the retailer.
- Crop mobs, a group of agricultural volunteers who help out at a small farm
- Text messages that were sent in the Philippines, which are thought to be partly responsible for the demonstration that ousted former President Joseph Estrada. Examples of such a text message read "Wear black to mourn the death of democracy", "Expect there to be rumbles" and "Go to EDSA".
- The 11 March 2004 Madrid attacks (11M), and the reaction from the people against the government in the Spanish elections of 14 March 2004.
- The 2005 civil unrest in France exhibited smart mobs—the French national police spokesman, Patrick Hamon, was quoted in the Wall Street Journal as saying that youths, mainly those of the Muslim faith, in individual neighborhoods were communicating by cellphone text messages, online blogs, and/or email—arranging meetings and warning each other about police operations.
- The 2006 student protests in Chile and 2007 Chilean government-Microsoft agreement are the example in Latin America about the smart mobs and the use of weblogs, Fotologs, Photoblogs, text messages and digital organization in a few hours. Also due to their online organization has called the attention of the press as a source of news because of the strong activism online.
- On July 5, 2005, during U2's performance of the song "New Year's Day" at a stadium in Chorzów, Poland, the audience of 70,000 waved colored articles of clothing to form a giant Polish flag of white and red: fans on the pitch waved red, those in the bleachers waved white. This behavior was coordinated by fans communicating on the internet.
- On November 6, 2008, more than 500 students across Taiwan began a sit-in protest in front of the Executive Yuan. Known as the Wild Strawberry Students Movement 野草莓學運, this assembly was mobilised overnight with the help of an on-line Bulletin Board System (BBS). The students were equipped with mobile technology such as HSDPA (high speed download packet access) and web-cameras. They soon set up a live broadcast that aired for 24 hours a day over the internet for more than a week, and they used mobile devices to keep up to date with government reactions on the mass media. One of the main themes of the protest was for amendment of the Assembly and Parade Law that curbed freedom of expression: this demand earned support from various non-government organizations nationwide.
- The release of the Baauer song "Harlem Shake" was a smart mob phenomena in 2013. The song reached 700 million views in the month of February 2013 on YouTube. The song and dance has influences from a dance originally released in the 1980s. The phenomenon involves large groups of people banding together, utilizing their weak ties, and all filming a video dancing to "Harlem Shake". On February 10, 2013, the upload rate of the "Harlem Shake" videos was 4,000 per day onto YouTube. The increasing popularity has enabled the video to become used as a political statement, such as in Egypt, where a smart mob formed to perform the dance outside the Egyptian Islamic president's headquarters. According to Rhinegold's characteristics of what makes a smart mob, such as a lack of centralized control and peer-to-peer influence, the "Harlem Shake" is the epitome of a smart mob.

== In popular culture ==
The comic book Global Frequency, written by Warren Ellis, describes a covert, non-governmental intelligence organization built around a smart mob of people that are called on to provide individual expertise in solving extraordinary crises.

David Brin's speculative science fiction novel, Existence (ISBN 978-0-765-30361-5), similarly posits the use of on-the-fly smart mobs by credible journalists as sources of information and expertise.

== See also ==
- Anonymous (group)
- Collaborative software
- Crowd manipulation
- E-democracy
- Flash crowd
- Global brain
- Recommendation system
- Science studies
- User-generated content
- Virtual community
- The Wisdom of Crowds
