= Operation Vijiji =

Operation Vijiji (Operation Villagisation) was an exercise in social engineering carried out in post-colonial Tanzania in 1973. Through its socialist approach of ujamaa, Tanzania had carried out a voluntary process of rural collectivization of property and communal ownership of agriculture. From 1973 to 1976, Tanzania sought to implement these goals through the forced villagization process of Operation Vijiji.

== History ==
The Tanzanian socialist approach of ujamaa focused on collectivizing ownership of property and communal organization of agriculture in the Tanzanian countryside. This re-organization of the countryside began on a voluntary and experimental basis. From 1973 to 1975, these goals were pursued through the forced villagization process of Operation Vijiji.

Operation Vijiji involved the relocation, sometimes forced, of many thousands of rural Tanzanians to Ujamaa villages in order to facilitate communal farming and common services. The intention was that the whole rural population would move by 1976.
