= Kolkhoz =

Type of agricultural cooperative in the Soviet Union

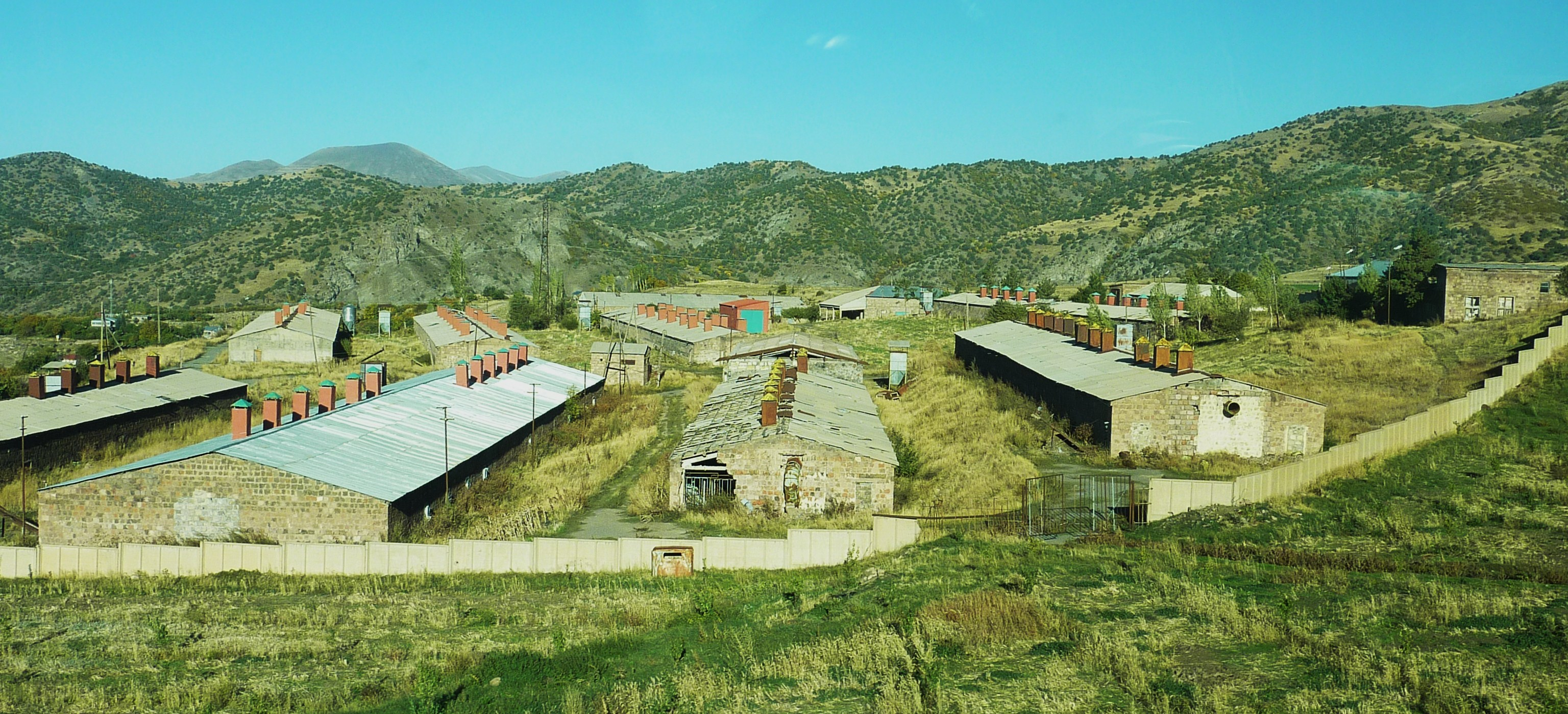
A former kolkhoz near Jermuk, Armenia

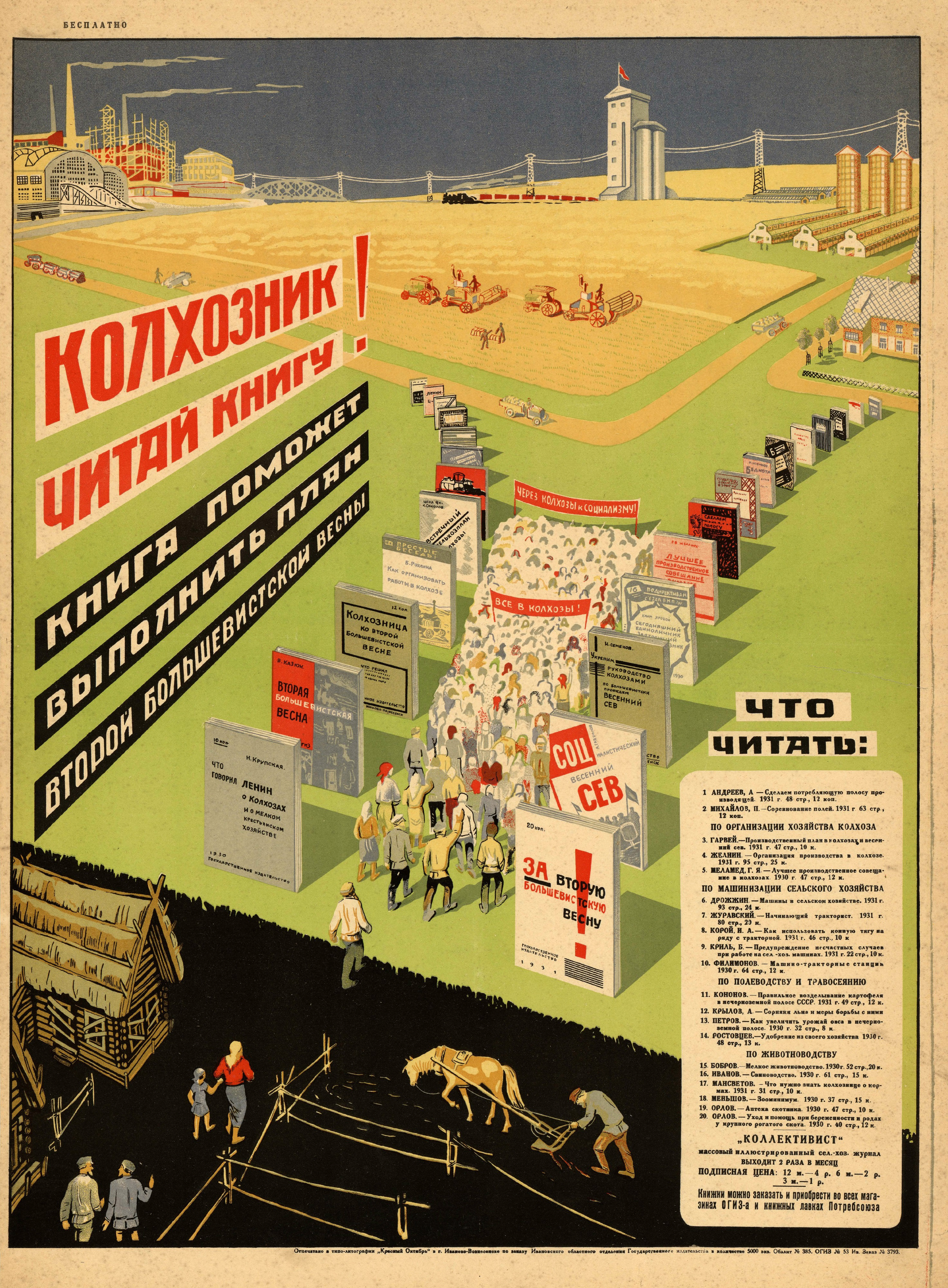
1931 propaganda poster: "Kolkhoznik, read the book! The book will help fulfill the plan of the second Bolshevik spring!"

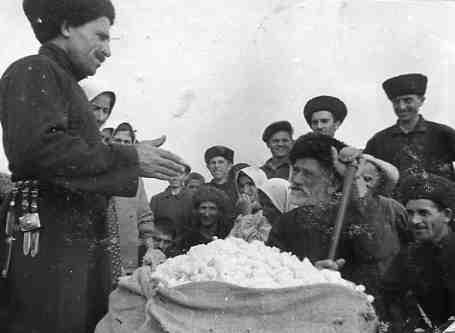
Cotton growers at the "Zarya Vostoka" (Eastern Dawn) kolkhoz, Checheno-Ingush ASSR, 1938

A kolkhoz (Russian plural: kolkhozy; anglicized plural: kolkhozes; Russian: колхо́з, IPA: [kɐlˈxos]) was a form of collective farm in the Soviet Union. Kolkhozes existed along with state farms or sovkhozes. (Note: Russian: совхо́з, a contraction of советское хозяйство, soviet ownership or state ownership, sovetskoye khozaystvo. Russian plural: sovkhozy; anglicized plural: sovkhozes.) These were the major components of the agriculture in the Soviet Union. The term continued to exist in some post-Soviet states.

== Name ==
Map of the kolkhozes (kolūkis) of the Lithuanian SSR.

The portmanteau колхоз, kolkhóz is a contraction of коллективное хозяйство, kollektívnoye khozyáystvo, 'collective farm'. This Russian term was adopted into other languages as a loanword; however, some other languages calqued equivalents from native roots, such as Ukrainian колгосп, kolhósp, from колективне господарство, kolektývne hospodárstvo. In Belarus, the term was known as калгас, калектыўная гаспадарка, kalhas, kalektywnaya haspadarka, in Lithuania – kolūkis, kolektyvinis ūkis.

The Russian terms for members of a kolkhoz is "kolkhoznik" (male) and "kolkhoznitsa" (female).

== Organization of kolkhozes ==
As a collective farm, a kolkhoz was legally organized as a production cooperative. Soon after the creation of the first Soviet state farms (sovkhozes), in 1918, the first collective farms were organized. In the USSR, there were three main types of collective farm enterprises:

- Partnerships for joint cultivation of land (TOZ / TPSOZ) - here only labor and part of the work (plowing, sowing, harvesting) were socialized, and the land, implements, and livestock remained in the personal or separate ownership of the peasants.
- Agricultural artels were the main and most common form. It socialized the main means of production (land, equipment, livestock, buildings), but collective farmers retained the right to a plot of land and small livestock for personal use.
- Agricultural communes were the most radical form, where absolutely everything was socialized: means of production, livestock, housing, and even everyday life with consumption.

Later, by 1938, as a result of the policy of complete collectivization, the other two forms practically disappeared or were transformed. The only official and remaining form of collective farming in the USSR was the agricultural artel, which in colloquial speech and official documents continued to be called a “collective farm”.

The Standard Charter of a kolkhoz, which since the early 1930s had the force of law in the USSR, is a model of cooperative principles in print. It speaks of the kolkhoz as a "form of agricultural production cooperative of peasants that voluntarily unite for the main purpose of joint agricultural production based on [...] collective labor". It asserts that "the kolkhoz is managed according to the principles of socialist self-management, democracy, and openness, with active participation of the members in decisions concerning all aspects of internal life".

In practice, the collective farm that emerged after Stalin’s collectivization campaign did not have many characteristics of a true cooperative, except for nominal joint ownership of non-land assets by the members (the land in the Soviet Union was nationalized in 1917). Even the basic principle of voluntary membership was violated by the process of forced collectivization; members did not retain a right of free exit, and those who managed to leave could not take their share of assets with them (neither in kind nor in cash-equivalent form).

The role of the sovereign general assembly and the democratically elected management in fact reduced to rubber-stamping the plans, targets, and decisions of the district and provincial authorities, who together with imposition of detailed work programs also nominated the preferred managerial candidates.

=== Work structure ===
==== Brigade ====
The most basic measure was to divide the workforce into a number of groups, generally known as brigades, for working purposes. By July 1929 it was already normal practice for the large kolkhoz of 200–400 households to be divided into temporary or permanent work units of 15–30 households.' The authorities gradually became in favour of the fixed, combined brigade – that is, the brigade with its personnel, land, equipment, and draft horses fixed to it for the whole period of agricultural operations, and taking responsibility for all relevant tasks during that period. The brigade was headed by a brigade leader (brigadir). This was usually a local man (a few were women).

==== Zveno ====
Brigades could be subdivided into smaller units called zvenos (links) for carrying out some or all of their tasks.

== Kolkhoz conditions in the Stalin period ==
In a kolkhoz, a member, called a kolkhoznik (Russian: колхо́зник, feminine form kolkhoznitsa, Russian: колхо́зница), received a share of the farm's product and profit according to the number of days worked, whereas a sovkhoz employed salaried workers. In practice, many kolkhozy did not pay their members in cash. In 1946, 30 percent of kolkhozy paid no cash for labour, 10.6 paid no grain, and 73.2 percent paid 500 grams of grain or less per day worked. In addition, the kolkhoz was required to sell its grain crop and other products to the State at fixed prices. These were set by Soviet government very low, and the difference between what the State paid the farm and what the State charged consumers represented a major source of income for the Soviet government. This profit was used to fund the purchase of foreign machinery to accelerate the industrialisation of the Soviet Union, which Stalin and the AUCP believed was necessary to modernise the USSR and its population to avoid military disasters like those suffered in the First World War and the Russo-Japanese War.

In 1948, the Soviet government charged wholesalers 335 rubles for 100 kilograms of rye, but paid the kolkhoz roughly 8 rubles. Nor did such prices change much to keep up with inflation. Prices paid by the Soviet government hardly changed at all between 1929 and 1953, meaning that the State came to pay less than one half or even one third of the cost of production.

Members of kolkhozes had the right to hold a small area of private land and some animals. The size of the private plot varied over the Soviet period, but was usually about 1 acre (0.40 ha). Before the Russian Revolution of 1917, a peasant with less than 13.5 acres (5.5 ha) was considered too poor to maintain a family. However, the productivity of such plots is reflected in the fact that in 1938, 3.9 percent of total sown land was in the form of private plots, but in 1937 those plots produced 21.5 percent of gross agriculture output. Kolkhoz members had to perform a minimum number of labor days per year both on the kolkhoz and on other government work (such as road building). In one kolkhoz, the official requirements were a minimum of 130 labor days a year for each able-bodied adult and 50 days per boy aged between 12 and 16. This work requirement was unevenly distributed around the year according to the agricultural cycle, ranging from 30 required labor days between January 1 and June 15, to 30 required labor days in a single month during harvest. If kolkhoz members did not complete the required minimum, the penalties could involve confiscation of the farmer's private plot and a trial in front of a People's Court that could result in three to eight months of hard labour on the kolkhoz or up to one year in a corrective labour camp.

However, the number of labor days completed by laborers was often much higher than the minimum. For that same kolkhoz mentioned above, the average number of labor days completed by each able-bodied member was 275, more than twice the official minimum. In essence, the requirement was the amount of labor days below which kolkhoz members would become subject to punitive state measures, but fulfilling this minimum would not then release the laborers from obligations to perform additional work demanded by the kolkhoz or state authorities.

Specific tasks on kolkhozes were assigned a particular number of labor days, with the rates determined in advance by state authorities. For example, thinning a tenth of a hectare of sugar beets was typically equivalent to two and a half labor days. However, the official rates and the actual ability of individual laborers were often highly disproportionate. Completing one labor day of work (nominally 8 hours) would often require multiple twelve-hour days of work to complete. Because laborers were compensated based on the number of labor days they completed, not time spent working, the labor day ultimately functioned more as an abstract method by which state authorities predetermined labor costs and kolkhoz production requirements, rather than as a method for fairly compensating workers for their labor. As such, the official rates greatly underrepresent both the labor requirements of agricultural production on kolkhozes and the demand placed on kolkhoz workers for that labor.

== Basic statistics for the Soviet Union ==
Kolkhozes and sovkhozes in the Soviet Union: number of farms, average size, and share in agricultural production

| Year | Number of kolkhozes | Number of sovkhozes | Kolkhoz size, ha | Sovkhoz size, ha | Share of kolkhozes | Share of sovkhozes | Share of households |
|---|---|---|---|---|---|---|---|
| 1960 | 44,000 | 7,400 | 6,600 | 26,200 | 44% | 18% | 38% |
| 1965 | 36,300 | 11,700 | 6,100 | 24,600 | 41% | 24% | 35% |
| 1970 | 33,000 | 15,000 | 6,100 | 20,800 | 40% | 28% | 32% |
| 1975 | 28,500 | 18,100 | 6,400 | 18,900 | 37% | 31% | 32% |
| 1980 | 25,900 | 21,100 | 6,600 | 17,200 | 35% | 36% | 29% |
| 1985 | 26,200 | 22,700 | 6,500 | 16,100 | 36% | 36% | 28% |
| 1990 | 29,100 | 23,500 | 5,900 | 15,300 | 36% | 38% | 26% |

Source: Statistical Yearbook of the USSR, various years, State Statistical Committee of the USSR, Moscow.

In 1986, fewer than 10% of kolkhoz workers in Soviet Central Asia were aged 55 or older, while in some western republics (Belarus and Lithuania) over 20% reached the same age.

== Kolkhozes after 1991 ==
With the dissolution of the Soviet Union in December 1991, the general policy of transition from the Soviet centrally planned economy to a market economy was announced. The number of kolkhozes and sovkhozes declined rapidly after 1992, while other corporate forms gained in prominence.

Still, field surveys conducted in CIS countries in the 1990s generally indicated that, in the opinion of the members and the managers, many of the new corporate farms behaved and functioned for all practical reasons like the old kolkhozes. Formal re-registration did not produce radical internal restructuring of the traditional Soviet farm.

Number of kolkhozes and all corporate farms in Russia, Ukraine, and Moldova 1990–2005

| | Russia | | Ukraine | | Moldova | |
| Year | Number of kolkhozes | All corporate farms | Number of kolkhozes | All corporate farms | Number of kolkhozes | All corporate farms |
|---|---|---|---|---|---|---|
| 1990 | 12,800 | 29,400 | 8,354 | 10,792 | 531 | 1,891 |
| 1995 | 5,522 | 26,874 | 450 | 10,914 | 490 | 1,232 |
| 2000 | 3,000 | 27,645 | 0 | 14,308 | 41 | 1,386 |
| 2005 | 2,000 | 22,135 | 0 | 17,671 | 4 | 1,846 |

Sources:

- For Russia, Agriculture in Russia, statistical yearbook, State Statistical Committee, Moscow, various years.
- For Ukraine, Rethinking Agricultural Reform in Ukraine, IAMO, Halle, Germany.
- For Moldova, land balance tables, State Land Cadastre Agency, Chisinau, various years.

Kolkhozes have disappeared almost completely in Transcaucasian and Central Asian states. In Armenia, Georgia, and Azerbaijan, the disappearance of the kolkhoz was part of an overall individualization of agriculture, with family farms displacing corporate farms in general. In Central Asian countries, some corporate farms persist, but no kolkhozes remain. Thus, in Turkmenistan, a presidential decree of June 1995 summarily "reorganized" all kolkhozes into "peasant associations" (Turkmen: daikhan berleshik). In Tajikistan, a presidential decree of October 1995 initiated a process of conversion of kolkhozes into share-based farms operating on leased land, agricultural production cooperatives, and dehkan (peasant) farms. However, contrary to the practice in all other CIS countries, one-third of the 30,000 peasant farms in Tajikistan are organized as collective dehkan farms and not family farms. These collective dehkan farms are often referred to as "kolkhozy" in the vernacular, although legally they are a different organizational form and the number of "true" kolkhozes in Tajikistan today is less than 50. Similarly in Uzbekistan the 1998 Land Code renamed all kolkhozes and sovkhozes shirkats (Uzbek for agricultural cooperatives) and just five years later, in October 2003, the government's new strategy for land reform prescribed a sweeping reorientation from shirkats to peasant farms, which since then have virtually replaced all corporate farms.

In Belarus, kolkhozes survived, although it is no longer an official classification: in 2014 Lukashenka ordered to formally reorganize them into the enterprises of types "хозяйственное общество" and "коммунальное унитарное предприятие". The land in Belarus is owned by the state, but for small plots privatized for personal use.

== See also ==
- Collective farming – similar type or organization in other countries
- Labour Cooperative Agricultural Farm, similar type or organization in the People's Republic of Bulgaria.
- Kibbutz, in Israel
