= Labour Cooperative Agricultural Farm =

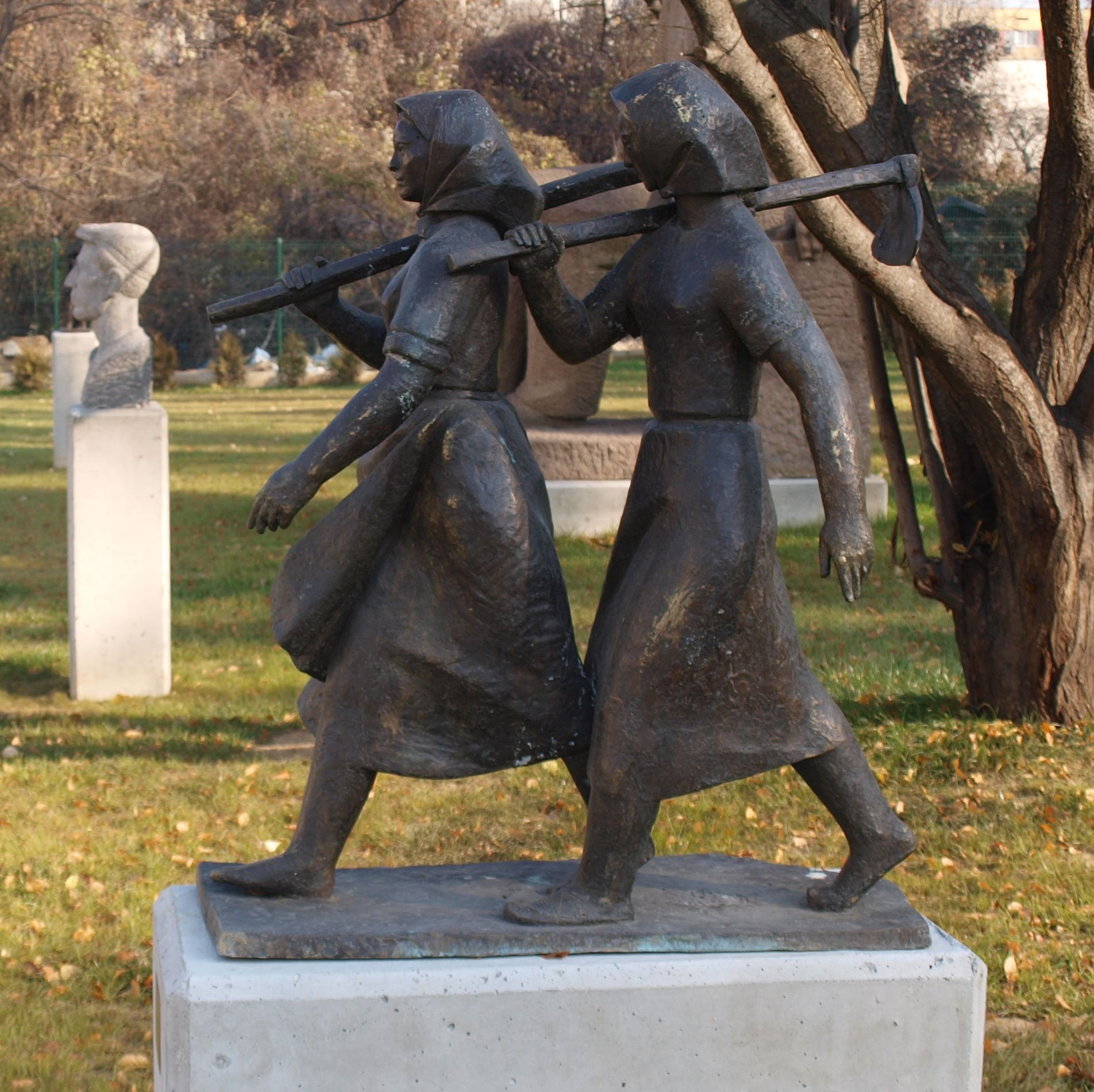
"Cooperators", sculpture at the Museum of Socialist Art in Sofia

Labour Cooperative Agricultural Farm (Bulgarian: Трудово кооперативно земеделско стопанство) known in its Bulgarian acronym TKZS is an agricultural cooperative in the People's Republic of Bulgaria on the Soviet model. The TKZS were initially and by design voluntarily created, but the mass collectivization of land often led to violent measures to socialize the property of a large part of the rural owners - especially the richest. The cooperation of farmers in various profiles of agricultural production and sales of production until 1944 developed according to principles and structure corresponding to those in other countries in Europe. Until then, Bulgaria was in second place in the world in terms of development of the cooperative movement after Denmark with consumer, credit and savings and agricultural cooperatives created mainly after the First World War. Agricultural producers become members and unite in cooperatives by industry, participating with share capital or membership fees to achieve the goals of these voluntary associations - mutual assistance, a uniform pricing policy, innovations and a commercial structure for the sale of the produced product. The governing bodies are elected and are accountable for their activities to all members of the cooperative.

== History ==
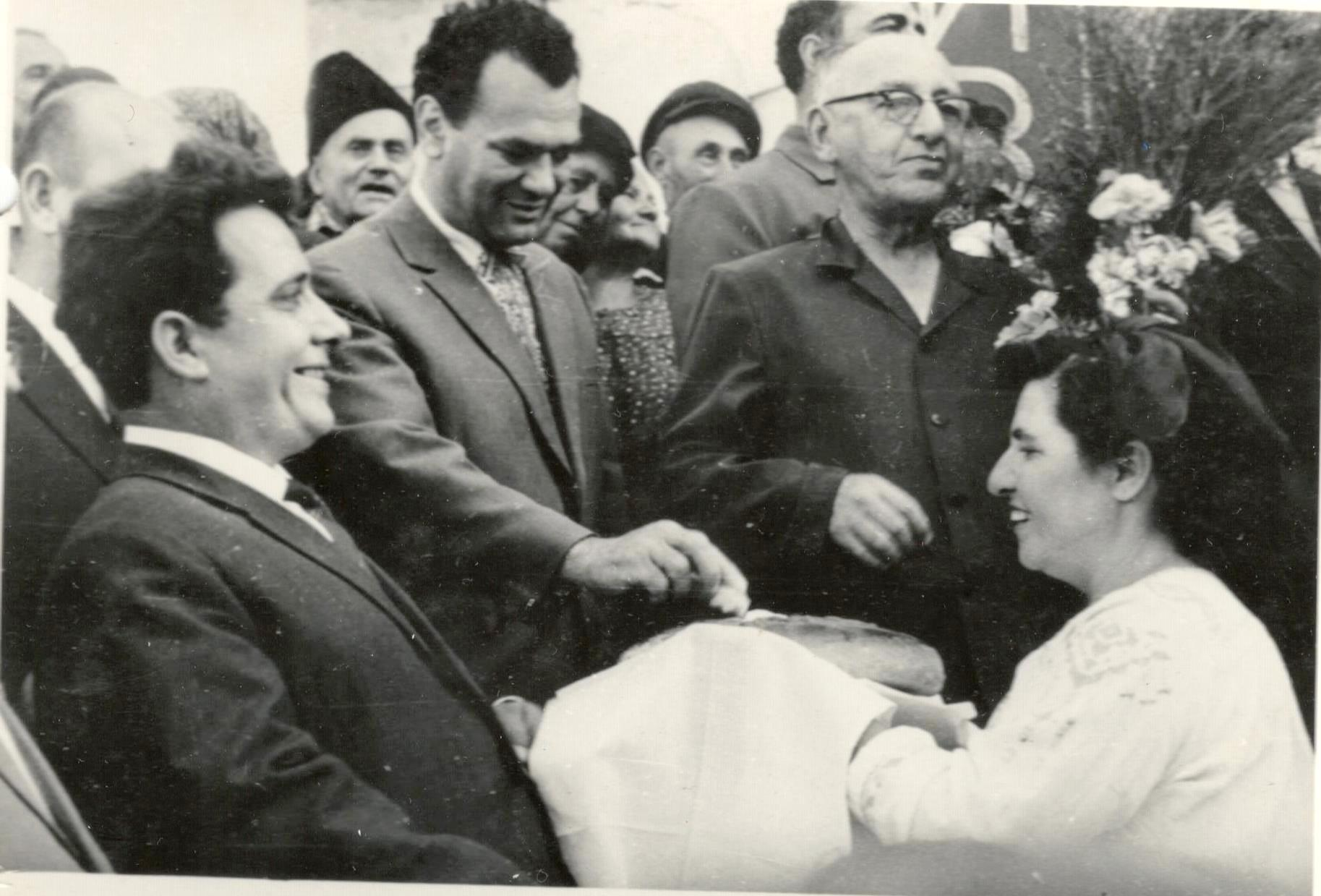
Festive delegation from the Soviet Union at the TKZS village of Yuper, Kubrat Municipality, 1965

The first state legislative act that regulates the issues of the name and status of labour cooperative agricultural farms was the Ordinance-Law on Labour Cooperative Agricultural Farms promulgated in the State Gazette, issue 95 of 25.04.1945. The promulgated text was amended in 1947 and 1948. The law establishes two principles for the establishment of such cooperative associations - as a cooperative as an independent legal entity and as a department of existing local consumer and credit cooperatives.

The ordinance-law largely repeats the provisions of the Model Statute of Agricultural Production Cooperatives, developed by the Bulgarian Agricultural and Cooperative Bank in 1940. Unlike the later structure of the TKZS, it provided for the preservation of the private property of the members and the payment of rent in the amount of 40% of the farm's income. At the same time, the new TKZS were exempt from taxes for three years and could receive state and municipal properties free of charge.

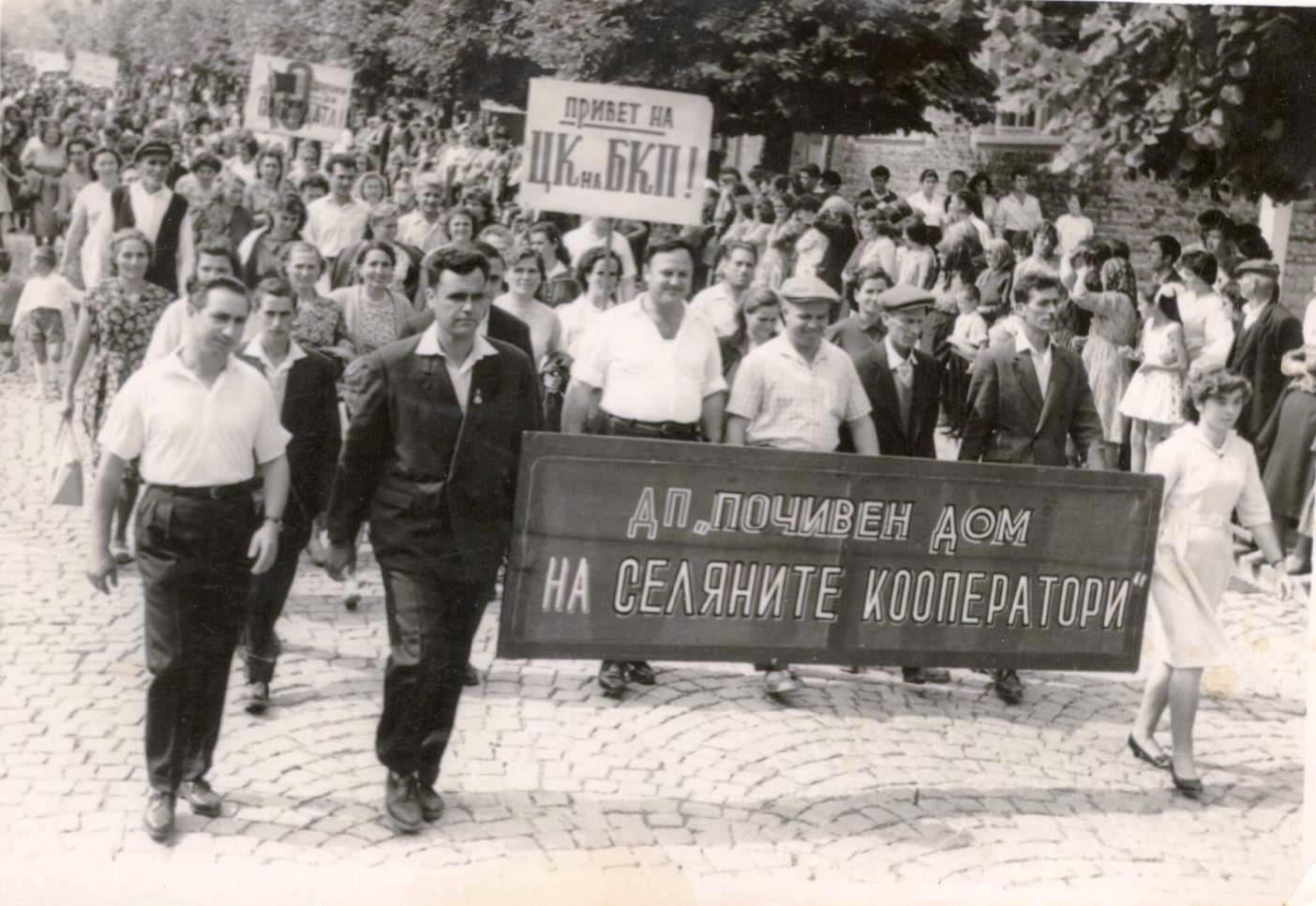
Demonstration of employees at a rest home of the TKZS, 1960s

In the spring of 1945, the first voluntary associations for collective land cultivation were formed as departments of the existing structures of the all-round cooperative in the villages. Encouraged by the ideas of Aleksandar Stamboliyski for the creation of the so-called agricultural mutual aid cooperative association, the "All-round" was a tested structure of the cooperative. With share contributions from its members, it supported them on the principle of a mutual aid fund and developed credit and commercial activities for the purchase of agricultural production and the sale of goods to the population. By the beginning of the 1950s, the credit activities of the rural all-round cooperatives were closed and they remained to operate as consumer cooperatives.

The organized departments for collective land cultivation in these peasant cooperatives have nothing in common with the model of Soviet collective farms and the associations use the principles of cooperation in Europe with the following characteristic features:

- Membership is voluntary;
- Everyone receives remuneration according to the labour invested;
- Everyone receives rent for the invested share capital of land, equipment and money;
- The land remains the property of each member and has the right to participate in the association according to their interest;
- The management team is elected and reports to the General Assembly of the cooperative members.

From August to September 1945, some of these voluntary peasant associations were established as independent legal entities, and their statutes and organization incorporated the spirit and traditions of the cooperative movement in Bulgaria up to that time.

The principles of communist ideology state that "private property gives rise to capitalism daily, hourly, minute by minute." The restructuring of private agricultural property and the dispossession of peasants was a process that began with the Fifth Congress of the Bulgarian Communist Party in 1948. The great social and political diversity in Bulgarian villages meant that the majority of the population in Bulgaria was not connected to socialism. In order to avoid political conflict and resistance to the policies of the Bulgarian Communist Party, an accelerated "reconstruction" of agriculture was undertaken, including:

- Rapid collectivization of peasants, without nationalization of the land;
- Unification of fragmented agricultural lands and the increase of agrotechnical measures for higher agricultural production;
- Mechanization of agricultural labour.

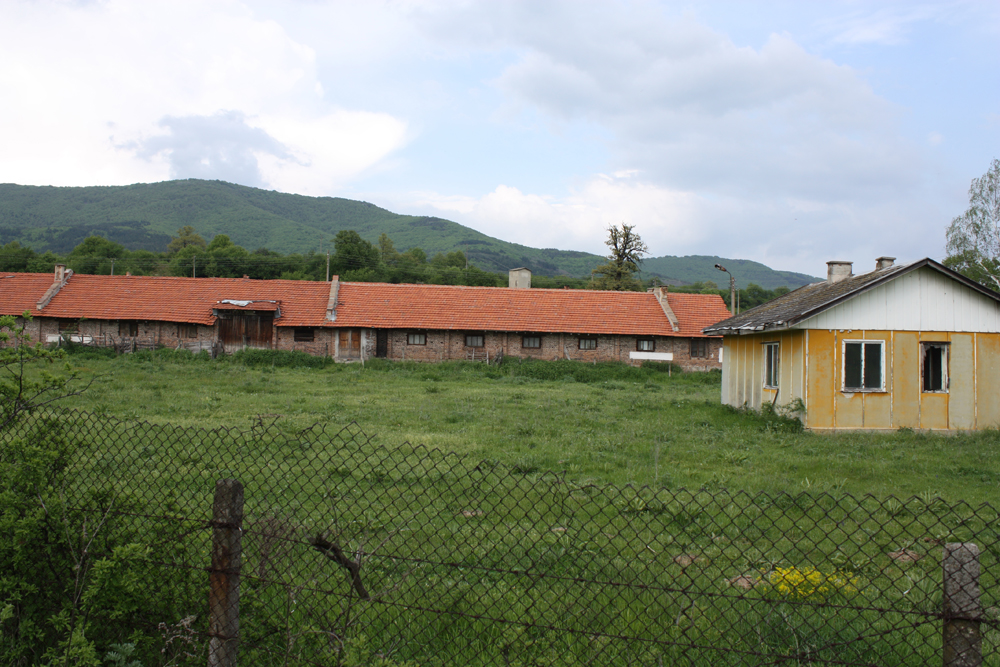
Buildings of the former TKZS in Ochusha, Kostenets Municipality, 2011.

To overcome the crisis in agricultural production, in September 1969, at the September Plenum of the Central Committee of the Bulgarian Communist Party, a decision was made to reunify the TKZS, moving towards the creation of agro-industrial complexes (AICs). It was expected that the concentration of resources and specialization would lead to a stable economy in the villages. The idea of this new, larger unification had opponents even within the ranks of the Bulgarian Communist Party.

According to historian Mihail Gruev, the creation of the TKZS confirmed and strengthened the relative tolerance in Bulgarian society towards thefts of public property, which had been noted in earlier periods. Initially perceived as a means for the state to seize people's property, the TKZS soon began to be perceived by some as the site of mass theft, often justified by forced collectivization. Such theft was so widespread that it became a significant part of the income of some TKZS workers and an important motivation for working there.

== See also ==
- Landwirtschaftliche Produktionsgenossenschaft
- State Agricultural Farm
