= Crop mob =

A Crop Mob is a group of volunteers who incidentally get together to carry out a set of agricultural tasks as requested by the owner or manager of the plot where the group assembles. A defining characteristic is that farmers and gardeners work in large groups.

== History ==
The term crop mob was coined in or before 2008 by volunteer farmhands working on a biofarm in the Research Triangle area of North Carolina. The first so-called crop mob took place in October 2008 with 19 volunteers. A website and social media were set up. Before 2010, 15 crop mobs were organized. The idea took off and crop mobs were organized in at least 70 other places.

=== Examples of organized crop mobs ===
- Atlanta, GA
- Pennsylvania, organized by the Sustainability Institute at Penn State University
- Vermont, organized by the Center for Sustainable Agriculture of the University of Vermont
- Michigan, organized by the Michigan Young Farmer Coalition

== Interpretation ==
Crop Mob has been described as "a modern, Internet-connected take on the agrarian culture that faded with the industrialization of farming. In a tough market, crop mobs can give small farms a shot in the arm and connect them to potential customers."

The number of small farms, those fewer than 10 acres (40,000 m^{2}), in the Research Triangle Park area grew 14 percent from 2002 to 2007, from about 4,400 to 5,000, according to Roland McReynolds, executive director of the Carolina Farm Stewardship Association. By comparison, the total number of farms of all sizes statewide dropped two percent during the same period, McReynolds says. The help of groups of volunteers can be important for small farms.

Another guiding idea is that crop mobs help young people to learn from experienced farmers about agriculture and sustainable farming.
